

Deaths in February

 3: Dick McGuire
 4: Bill Dudley
10: Eduard Vinokurov
12: Nodar Kumaritashvili

Current sporting seasons

Auto racing 2010

Sprint Cup

World Rally Championship

Nationwide Series
Camping World Truck Series

V8 Supercar

GP2 Asia Series

Rolex Sports Car Series

Basketball 2010

NBA
NCAA Division I men
NCAA Division I women
Euroleague
Eurocup
EuroChallenge

Australia
France
Germany
Greece
Iran
Israel
Italy
Philippines
Philippine Cup Finals
Russia
Spain
Turkey

Cricket 2009–2010

Australia:
Sheffield Shield
Ford Ranger Cup

Bangladesh:
National League

India:
Ranji Trophy

New Zealand:
Plunket Shield
Pakistan:
Quaid-i-Azam Trophy
South Africa:
SuperSport Series
Sri Lanka:
Premier Trophy

Zimbabwe:
Logan Cup

Football (soccer) 2010

National teams competitions
2011 FIFA Women's World Cup qualification (UEFA)
2011 AFC Asian Cup qualification

International clubs competitions
UEFA (Europe) Champions League
Europa League
UEFA Women's Champions League
Copa Libertadores (South America)

AFC (Asia) Champions League

CAF (Africa) Champions League
CAF Confederation Cup
CONCACAF (North & Central America) Champions League
OFC (Oceania) Champions League
Domestic (national) competitions
Argentina
Australia

England
France
Germany
Iran
Italy

Scotland
Spain

Golf 2010

PGA Tour
European Tour
LPGA Tour
Champions Tour

Ice hockey 2010

National Hockey League

Motorcycle racing 2010

Superbike World Championship

Rugby union 2010

2011 Rugby World Cup qualifying
Heineken Cup
European Challenge Cup
English Premiership
Celtic League
LV Cup
Top 14
Super 14
Sevens World Series

Winter sports

Alpine Skiing World Cup
Biathlon World Cup

Cross-Country Skiing World Cup

Freestyle Skiing World Cup

Nordic Combined World Cup

Ski Jumping World Cup
Snowboard World Cup
Speed Skating World Cup

Days of the month

February 28, 2010 (Sunday)

Athletics
Tokyo Marathon:
Men:  Masakazu Fujiwara  2:12:19
Women:  Alevtina Biktimirova  2:34:39

Auto racing
NASCAR Sprint Cup Series:
Shelby American in Las Vegas, Nevada:
 (1)  Jimmie Johnson (Chevrolet, Hendrick Motorsports) (2)  Kevin Harvick (Chevrolet, Richard Childress Racing) (3)  Jeff Gordon (Chevrolet, Hendrick Motorsports)
Drivers' standings (after 3 of 36 races): (1) Harvick 506 points (2)  Clint Bowyer (Chevrolet, Richard Childress Racing) 459 (3)  Mark Martin (Chevrolet, Hendrick Motorsports) 457

Bandy
Women's World Championship in Drammen, Norway:
Bronze medal game:   3–2 
Gold medal game:   3–2  
Sweden win the title for the fifth consecutive time.

Cricket
Australia in New Zealand:
2nd T20I in Christchurch:
 214/6 (20 overs, BB McCullum 116*);  214/4 (20 overs). Match tied; New Zealand win the Super Over. 2-match series drawn 1–1.
England in Bangladesh:
1st ODI in Mirpur:
 228 (45.4 overs, Tamim Iqbal 125);  229/4 (46 overs). England won by 6 wickets, lead 3-match series 1–0.
Zimbabwe in West Indies:
Only T20I in Port of Spain, Trinidad:
 105 (19.5 overs);  79/7 (20 overs). Zimbabwe win by 26 runs, win 1-match series 1–0.

Field hockey
Men's World Cup in New Delhi, India:
Pool B:
 2–4 
 2–3 
 4–1

Football (soccer)
 Football League Cup Final at Wembley Stadium, London:
Aston Villa 1–2 Manchester United
Manchester United win the trophy for the fourth time.

Golf
PGA Tour:
Phoenix Open in Scottsdale, Arizona:
Winner: Hunter Mahan  268 (−16)
Mahan wins his second PGA Tour title.
LPGA Tour:
HSBC Women's Champions in Singapore:
Winner: Ai Miyazato  278 (−10)
Miyazato completes a sweep of both events in the tour's opening Asian swing, giving her three LPGA Tour titles in her career.

Motorcycle racing
Superbike:
Phillip Island Superbike World Championship round in Phillip Island (Victoria), Australia:
Race 1: (1) Leon Haslam  (Suzuki GSX-R1000) (2) Michel Fabrizio  (Ducati 1098R) (3) Noriyuki Haga  (Ducati 1098R)
Haslam wins the race by 0.004 seconds, the closest-recorded finish in the history of the Superbike World Championship.
Race 2: (1) Carlos Checa   (Ducati 1098R) (2) Haslam (3) Fabrizio
Rider's standings (after 2 of 26 races): (1) Haslam 45 points (2) Fabrizio 36 (3) Checa 34.
Supersport:
Phillip Island Supersport World Championship round in Phillip Island (Victoria), Australia:
(1) Eugene Laverty  (Honda CBR600RR) (2) Joan Lascorz  (Kawasaki ZX-6R) (3) Kenan Sofuoğlu  (Honda CBR600RR)
Rider's standings (after 1 of 13 races): (1) Laverty 25 points (2) Lascorz 20 (3) Sofuoğlu 16.

Olympic Games
Winter Olympics in Vancouver, British Columbia, Canada:
Cross-country skiing – Men's 50 kilometre classical:  Petter Northug  2:05:35.5  Axel Teichmann  +0.3  Johan Olsson  +1.0
Northug wins his second title and fourth medal of the Games, and becomes the most decorated male athlete.
Olsson wins his third medal of the Games and the fourth medal of his career.
Ice hockey – Men:
Gold medal game:   2–3 (OT)  
Sidney Crosby's goal after 7:40 minutes in overtime gives Canada their fourteenth gold medal of the Games, the most earned by a country in a single Winter Olympics.
Team Canada becomes the fourth team, after the United States men in 1960 and 1980 and Canada's women in these Games, to win the gold medal on home ice.
Team Canada player Eric Staal and coach Mike Babcock become the newest members of the Triple Gold Club, consisting of individuals who have won an Olympic gold, a World Championship gold, and the Stanley Cup. Babcock becomes the first coach in history to win all three competitions.
The USA win their 37th medal, the most by any country in a single Winter Olympics.
General records:
Norwegian cross-country skier Marit Bjørgen is the most decorated athlete of the Games, with five medals, including three gold. Her teammate Petter Northug is the most decorated man, with four medals (2 gold).
Chinese short track speed skater Wang Meng is the only other triple gold medallist.

Tennis
ATP World Tour:
Dubai Tennis Championships in Dubai, United Arab Emirates:
Final: Novak Djokovic  def. Mikhail Youzhny  7–5, 5–7, 6–3
Djokovic wins his 17th career title and his second successive title at this event.
Delray Beach International Tennis Championships in Delray Beach, United States:
Final: Ernests Gulbis  def. Ivo Karlović  6–2, 6–3
Gulbis wins his first career title.
WTA Tour:
Malaysia Classic in Kuala Lumpur, Malaysia:
Final: Alisa Kleybanova  def. Elena Dementieva  6–3, 6–2
Kleybanova wins her first career title.

February 27, 2010 (Saturday)

Auto racing
Nationwide Series:
Sam's Town 300 in Las Vegas, Nevada:
 (1)  Kevin Harvick (Chevrolet, Kevin Harvick Incorporated) (2)  Denny Hamlin (Toyota, Joe Gibbs Racing) (3)  Carl Edwards (Ford, Roush Fenway Racing)
Drivers' standings (after 3 of 35 races): (1) Edwards 505 points (2)  Brad Keselowski (Dodge, Penske Racing) 464 (3)  Brian Vickers (Toyota, Braun Racing) 457
V8 Supercars:
Desert 400 in Sakhir, Bahrain
Race 4: (1) Jamie Whincup  (Holden Commodore) (2) Mark Winterbottom  (Ford Falcon) (3) Shane van Gisbergen  (Ford Falcon)
Drivers' standings (after 4 of 26 races): (1) Whincup 600 points (2) Winterbottom 543 (3) Van Gisbergen 471

Cricket
South Africa In India:
3rd ODI in Ahmedabad:
 365/2 (50 overs, JH Kallis 104*, AB de Villiers 102*);  275 (44.3 overs). South Africa win by 90 runs. India win 3-match series 2–1.

Olympic Games
Winter Olympics in Vancouver, British Columbia, Canada:
Alpine skiing – men's slalom:  Giuliano Razzoli  1:39.32  Ivica Kostelić  +0.16  André Myhrer  +0.44
Kostelić wins his second medal of the Games (both silver) and the third medal of his career.
The Austrian men fail to win a medal in alpine skiing for the first time since 1936.
Bobsleigh – four-man:  Steven Holcomb/Steve Mesler/Curtis Tomasevicz/Justin Olsen  3:24.46  André Lange/Kevin Kuske/Alexander Rödiger/Martin Putze  +0.38  Lyndon Rush/David Bissett/Lascelles Brown/Chris le Bihan  +0.39
Team United States win their first gold medal in bobsleigh since 1948.
Lange and Kuske both win the fifth medal of their career, but fail to win the four-man title for the third successive time.
Cross-country skiing – women's 30 kilometre classical:  Justyna Kowalczyk  1:30:33.7  Marit Bjørgen  +0.3  Aino-Kaisa Saarinen  +1:05.0
Kowalczyk wins the fourth medal of her career, and becomes the first ever woman from Poland to win gold medal at the Winter Olympics, and only the second Polish champion in Winter Olympics history.
Bjørgen wins her fifth medal of the Games, and the seventh medal of her career. She is the most decorated athlete of the Games, with three gold medals, one silver and one bronze.
Saarinen wins the third medal of her career.
Curling – men's tournament:
Bronze medal final: Sweden (Edin) 4–5  Switzerland (Stöckli)
Gold medal final:  Canada (Martin) 6–3  Norway (Ulsrud)
The Canadian team, led by skip Kevin Martin, win the title for the second successive time, and become the first unbeaten winner in Olympic curling history.
Snowboarding – men's parallel giant slalom:  Jasey-Jay Anderson   Benjamin Karl   Mathieu Bozzetto 
Speed skating – men's team pursuit:
Final A:  Mathieu Giroux/Lucas Makowsky/Denny Morrison  3:41.37 def.  Brian Hansen/Chad Hedrick/Jonathan Kuck/Trevor Marsicano  +0.21
Final B:  Jan Blokhuijsen/Sven Kramer/Simon Kuipers/Mark Tuitert  3:39.95 OR def. Håvard Bøkko/Henrik Christiansen/Fredrik van der Horst  +0.55
Hedrick wins the fifth medal of his career.
Kramer wins the fourth medal of his career.
Tuitert wins the third medal of his career.
Speed skating – women's team pursuit:
Final A:  Daniela Anschütz-Thoms/Stephanie Beckert/Anni Friesinger-Postma/Katrin Mattscherodt  3:02.82 def.  Masako Hozumi/Nao Kodaira/Maki Tabata  +0.02
Final B:  Katarzyna Bachleda-Curuś/Katarzyna Woźniak/Luiza Złotkowska  3:03.73 def. Catherine Raney-Norman/Jennifer Rodriguez/Jilleanne Rookard  +1.57
Beckert wins her third medal of the Games.
Friesinger-Postma wins the third title and the fifth medal of her career.
Poland win its first medal in speed skating since 1960.
Ice hockey – men's tournament:
Bronze medal game:   5–3

Rugby union
Six Nations Championship, week 3:
 16–12  in Rome
 16–20  in London
Standings (after three matches):  6 points, England, Ireland 4, Italy 2, Scotland 0.
2011 Rugby World Cup qualifying:
European Nations Cup First Division, matchday 8: (teams in bold qualify for the 2011 Rugby World Cup, teams in strike are eliminated from qualifying contention)
 0–69  in Heusenstamm
 17–9  in Tbilisi
 21–21  in Sochi
 Russia qualify for their first World Cup ever.
 Standings (after 8 matches unless indicated): Georgia 23 points, Russia 21, Portugal 17, Romania 14 (7), Spain 9 (7), Germany 8.

Tennis
ATP Tour:
Abierto Mexicano Telcel in Acapulco, Mexico:
Final: David Ferrer  def. Juan Carlos Ferrero  6–3, 3–6, 6–1
Ferrer wins the eighth title of his career.
WTA Tour:
Abierto Mexicano Telcel in Acapulco, Mexico:
Final: Venus Williams  def. Polona Hercog  2–6, 6–2, 6–3
Williams wins her second title in successive weeks and the 43rd title of her career. She also wins this event for the second straight year.

February 26, 2010 (Friday)

Auto racing
V8 Supercars:
Desert 400 in Sakhir, Bahrain:
Race 3: (1) Jamie Whincup  (Holden Commodore) (2) Mark Winterbottom  (Ford Falcon) (3) Craig Lowndes  (Holden Commodore)
Drivers' standings (after 3 of 26 races): (1) Whincup 450 points (2) Winterbottom 405 (3) Lowndes 378

Cricket
Australia in New Zealand:
1st T20I in Wellington:
 118 (20 overs);  119/4 (16.0 overs). Australia win by 6 wickets, lead 2-match series 1–0.

Olympic Games
Winter Olympics in Vancouver, British Columbia, Canada:
Alpine skiing – Women's slalom:  Maria Riesch  1:42.89  Marlies Schild  +0.43  Šárka Záhrobská  +1.01
Riesch wins her second title of the Games.
Záhrobská wins the first ever medal for the Czech Republic in alpine skiing.
Biathlon – Men's relay:  Halvard Hanevold/Tarjei Bø/Emil Hegle Svendsen/Ole Einar Bjørndalen  1:21:38.1 (0 penalty loops + 7 missed shots)  Simon Eder/Daniel Mesotitsch/Dominik Landertinger/Christoph Sumann  +38.6 (1 + 9)  Ivan Tcherezov/Anton Shipulin/Maxim Tchoudov/Evgeny Ustyugov  +38.8 (0 + 4)
Bjørndalen wins the sixth title and the 11th medal of his career.
Hanevold wins the third title and the sixth medal of his career.
Svendsen wins his second title and third medal of the Games.
Austria win its first ever medal in the men's relay.
Curling – Women:
Bronze medal final:  China (Wang) 12–6 Switzerland (Ott)
China win the first ever medal in curling.
Gold medal final:  Canada (Bernard) 6–7  Sweden (Norberg)
The Swedish team of Anette Norberg, Eva Lund, Cathrine Lindahl and Anna Le Moine win the title for the second successive time.
Short track speed skating – Men's 500 metres:  Charles Hamelin  40.981  Sung Si-bak  +0.359  François-Louis Tremblay  +6.385
Hamelin sets a new Olympic record of 40.770 in the quarter-final.
Short track speed skating – Women's 1000 metres:  Wang Meng  1:29.213  Katherine Reutter  +0.111  Park Seung-hi  +0.166
Wang wins her third title of the Games, and the fourth title and sixth medal of her career.
China win all four women's events.
Zhou Yang  sets a new world record of 1:29.049 in the semi-final, but is disqualified in the final.
Short track speed skating – Men's 5000 metre relay:  Charles Hamelin/François Hamelin/Olivier Jean/François-Louis Tremblay  6:44.24  Kwak Yoon-gy/Lee Ho-suk/Lee Jung-su/Sung Si-bak  +0.202  J. R. Celski/Travis Jayner/Jordan Malone/Apolo Ohno  +0.274
Charles Hamelin wins his second title of the Games and third medal of his career.
Tremblay wins the second title and fifth medal of his career.
Ohno wins his third medal of the Games, and the eighth medal of his career.
Lee Ho-suk wins the fifth medal of his career.
Lee Jung-su wins his third medal of the Games.
Snowboarding – Women's parallel giant slalom:  Nicolien Sauerbreij   Ekaterina Ilyukhina   Marion Kreiner 
Sauerbreij wins the first medal for Netherlands in a winter sport other than speed skating or figure skating.
Bobsleigh – Four-man:
Standings after 2 runs: (1) Steven Holcomb/Steve Mesler/Curtis Tomasevicz/Justin Olsen  1:41.75 (2) Lyndon Rush/David Bissett/Lascelles Brown/Chris le Bihan  +0.40 (3) André Lange/Kevin Kuske/Alexander Rödiger/Martin Putze  +0.44
Ice hockey – Men:
Semifinals:
 6–1 
 3–2 
USA and Canada will meet in a repeat of the 2002 Olympic final.

Rugby union
Six Nations Championship, week 3:
 20–26  in Cardiff
Standings: France 6 points (3 matches),  4 (2),  2 (2), Wales 2 (3),  0 (2).

February 25, 2010 (Thursday)

Basketball
Euroleague Top 16, matchday 4 (teams eliminated from quarterfinal contention in strike):
Group E:
Panathinaikos Athens  67–70  Regal FC Barcelona
Partizan Belgrade  79–76  Maroussi Athens
Standings: Barcelona, Partizan 3–1; Maroussi 2–2; Panathinaikos 0–4.
Group F: Real Madrid  77–69  Montepaschi Siena
Standings: Maccabi Tel Aviv, Real Madrid, Efes Pilsen, Montepaschi 2–2.
Group G: Žalgiris Kaunas  89–84  Unicaja Málaga
Standings: CSKA Moscow, Asseco Prokom Gdynia 3–1; Unicaja, Žalgiris 1–3.
Group H: Khimki Moscow Region  83–94  Caja Laboral Baskonia
Standings: Olympiacos Piraeus 4–0; Caja Laboral Baskonia, Khimki Moscow Region 2–2; Cibona Zagreb 0–4.

Darts
Premier League round 3 in Belfast, Northern Ireland:
Mervyn King  6–8 Ronnie Baxter 
Adrian Lewis  6–8 Terry Jenkins 
Simon Whitlock  8–5 Raymond van Barneveld 
Phil Taylor  8–2 James Wade 
High Checkout: Ronnie Baxter 164
Standings (after three rounds): Taylor 6 points, King, Jenkins 4, Baxter, Whitlock 3, Lewis, van Barneveld 2, Wade 0.

Football (soccer)
UEFA Europa League Round of 32, second leg:
Anderlecht  4–0 (1–1)  Athletic Bilbao. Anderlecht win 5–1 on aggregate.
Marseille  3–1 (3–1)  Copenhagen. Marseille win 6–2 on aggregate.
Roma  2–3 (2–3)  Panathinaikos. Panathinaikos win 6–4 on aggregate.
Galatasaray  1–2 (1–1)  Atlético Madrid. Atlético Madrid win 3–2 on aggregate.
Shakhtar Donetsk  1–1 (1–2)  Fulham. Fulham win 3–2 on aggregate.
Unirea Urziceni  1–3 (0–1)  Liverpool. Liverpool win 4–1 on aggregate.
PSV Eindhoven  3–2 (0–1)  Hamburg. 3–3 on aggregate, Hamburg win on away goals.
Wolfsburg  4–1 (2–2)  Villarreal. Wolfsburg win 6–3 on aggregate.
Red Bull Salzburg  0–0 (2–3)  Standard Liège. Standard Liège win 3–2 on aggregate.
Werder Bremen  4–1 (0–1)  Twente. Werder Bremen win 4–2 on aggregate.
Fenerbahçe  1–1 (1–2)  Lille. Lille win 3–2 on aggregate.
Sporting CP  3–0 (1–2)  Everton. Sporting win 4–2 on aggregate.
Juventus  0–0 (2–1)  Ajax. Juventus win 2–1 on aggregate.
Valencia  3–0 (0–1)  Club Brugge (after extra time). Valencia win 3–1 on aggregate.
Hapoel Tel Aviv  0–0 (0–3)  Rubin Kazan. Rubin Kazan win 3–0 on aggregate.
Copa Libertadores Second Stage:
Group 2: Once Caldas  2–1  São Paulo
Standings (after 2 matches): Once Caldas 6 points, São Paulo, Monterrey 3, Nacional 0.
Group 4:
Blooming  1–4  Lanús
Universitario  0–0  Libertad
Standings (after 3 matches): Libertad, Universitario 7 points, Lanús 3, Blooming 0.

Olympic Games
Winter Olympics in Vancouver, British Columbia, Canada:
Alpine skiing – Women's giant slalom:  Viktoria Rebensburg  2:27.11  Tina Maze  +0.04  Elisabeth Görgl  +0.14
Rebensburg's title is her first ever win as a senior.
Cross-country skiing – Women's 4 x 5 kilometre relay:  Vibeke Skofterud/Therese Johaug/Kristin Størmer Steira/Marit Bjørgen  55:19.5  Katrin Zeller/Evi Sachenbacher-Stehle/Miriam Gössner/Claudia Nystad  +24.6  Pirjo Muranen/Virpi Kuitunen/Riitta-Liisa Roponen/Aino-Kaisa Saarinen  +30.4
Bjørgen wins her third title and fourth medal of the Games, and the sixth medal of her career.
Sachenbacher-Stehle wins the fifth medal of her career.
Figure skating – Ladies' singles:  Kim Yuna  228.56 WR (Free skating 150.06 WR)  Mao Asada  205.50  Joannie Rochette  202.64
Kim wins the first ever medal for Korea in figure skating, and smashes her own world record by 18 points.
Rochette wins the first medal for Canada in the women's event since Elizabeth Manley in 1988, just few days after the sudden death of her mother.
The United States fail to win a medal in the women's event for the first time since 1964, the Olympics that followed the airplane crash that decimated the entire US figure skating world team.
Asia emerge as the leading continent in figure skating for the first time with two titles and five medals.
Russia or the Soviet Union, and the entire European continent, fail to win any title in figure skating for the first time since 1960.
Freestyle skiing – Men's aerials:  Aleksei Grishin  248.41  Jeret Peterson  247.21  Liu Zhongqing  242.53
Grishin wins the first ever gold medal for Belarus in the Winter Olympics.
Nordic combined – Individual large hill/10 km:  Bill Demong  25:32.9  Johnny Spillane  +4.0  Bernhard Gruber  +10.8
Demong becomes the first American Olympic champion in any Nordic skiing discipline, while Spillane wins his third silver medal of the Games. The United States, that never won a medal in Nordic combined before these Games, finished as the most successful team in this sport.
Ice hockey – Women:
Bronze medal game:  2–3 (OT)  
Gold medal game:   2–0  
Canada win the title for the third successive time and extend its winning streak to 15 games.
Curling – Men:
Semifinals:
Sweden (Edin) 3–6 Canada (Martin)
Switzerland (Stöckli) 5–7 Norway (Ulsrud)
Curling – Women:
Semifinals:
Canada (Bernard) 6–5 Switzerland (Ott)
China (Wang) 4–9 Sweden (Norberg)

February 24, 2010 (Wednesday)

Basketball
Euroleague Top 16, matchday 4:
Group F: Efes Pilsen Istanbul  63–56  Maccabi Tel Aviv
Standings: Montepaschi Siena 2–1, Maccabi Tel Aviv, Efes Pilsen Istanbul 2–2, Real Madrid 1–2.
Group G: Asseco Prokom Gdynia  88–81  CSKA Moscow
Standings: CSKA Moscow, Asseco Prokom Gdynia 3–1, Unicaja Málaga 1–2, Žalgiris Kaunas 0–3.
Group H: Cibona Zagreb  94–97  Olympiacos Piraeus
Standings: Olympiacos Piraeus 4–0, Caja Laboral Baskonia 2–1, Khimki Moscow Region 1–2, Cibona Zagreb 0–4.

Cricket
South Africa In India:
2nd ODI in Gwalior:
 401/3 (50 overs, Sachin Tendulkar 200*);  248 (42.5 overs, AB de Villiers 114*). India win by 153 runs, lead the 3-match series 2–0.Tendulkar hits the highest individual score in the history of One Day International cricket, and becomes the first batsman to score a double century.

Football (soccer)
UEFA Champions League Round of 16, first leg:
CSKA Moscow  1–1  Sevilla
Internazionale  2–1  Chelsea
Copa Libertadores Second Stage:
Group 1: Corinthians  2–1  Racing
Standings (after 1 match): Corinthians 3 points, Independiente Medellín, Cerro Porteño 1, Racing 0.
Group 2: Monterrey  2–1  Nacional
Standings: Once Caldas, São Paulo 3 points (1 match), Monterrey 3 (2), Nacional 0 (2)
Group 3: Juan Aurich  2–0  Bolívar
Standings (after 2 matches): Alianza Lima 6 points, Estudiantes, Juan Aurich 3, Bolívar 0.
Group 7: Cruzeiro  4–1  Colo-Colo
Standings (after 2 matches): Vélez Sársfield 6 points, Cruzeiro, Colo-Colo 3, Deportivo Italia 0.
Group 8: Flamengo  2–0  Universidad Católica
Standings (after 1 match): Flamengo, Universidad de Chile 3 points, Caracas, Universidad Católica 0.
AFC Champions League, Round 1:
Group C:
Al-Ain  0–1  Pakhtakor Tashkent
Al-Shabab  1–1  Sepahan
Group D:
Al-Sadd  0–3  Al-Hilal
Mes Kerman  4–2  Al-Ahli
Group G:
Suwon Samsung Bluewings  0–0  Gamba Osaka
Henan Construction  0–0  Singapore Armed Forces
Group H:
Sanfrecce Hiroshima  0–1  Shandong Luneng
Adelaide United  1–0  Pohang Steelers
International friendlies
Under-17 men's match at Raymond James Stadium, Tampa, Florida, United States: United States   4–1 
Men's match at Raymond James Stadium, Tampa, Florida, United States:  2–1 
Men's match at Estadio Azteca, Mexico City:  5–0 

Olympic Games
Winter Olympics in Vancouver, British Columbia, Canada:
Bobsleigh – Two-woman:  Kaillie Humphries/Heather Moyse  3:32.28  Helen Upperton/Shelley-Ann Brown  +0.85  Erin Pac/Elana Meyers  +1.12
Canadian women win their first medals in bobsleigh.
Cross-country skiing – Men's 4 x 10 kilometre relay:  Daniel Rickardsson/Johan Olsson/Anders Södergren/Marcus Hellner  1:45:05.4  Martin Johnsrud Sundby/Odd-Bjørn Hjelmeset/Lars Berger/Petter Northug  +15.9  Martin Jakš/Lukáš Bauer/Jiří Magál/Martin Koukal  +16.5
Hellner wins his second title of the Games.
Northug wins his third medal of the Games.
Olsson wins the third medal of his career.
Sweden win its first gold medal in the men's relay since 1988.
Czech Republic win its first ever medal in any relay event.
Freestyle skiing – Women's aerials:  Lydia Lassila  214.74  Li Nina   207.23  Guo Xinxin  205.22
Li, the three-time reigning world champion in this event, has to settle for Olympic silver for the second time.
Short track speed skating – Women's 3000 metre relay:  Sun Linlin/Wang Meng/Zhang Hui/Zhou Yang  4:06.610 WR  Jessica Gregg/Kalyna Roberge/Marianne St-Gelais/Tania Vicent  +2.527  Allison Baver/Alyson Dudek/Lana Gehring/Katherine Reutter  +7.471
South Korea initially win the race but disqualified, and thus has its four-time winning streak in this event ended.
Wang wins her second title of the Games, and the third title and fourth medal of her career.
Zhou also win her second title of the Games.
Speed skating – Women's 5000 metres:  Martina Sáblíková  6:50.92  Stephanie Beckert +0.48  Clara Hughes  +4.82
Sáblíková wins her second title and third medal of the Games.
Hughes wins the fourth medal of her career in speed skating and her sixth medal overall (she also won two Olympic medals in cycling).
Alpine skiing – Women's giant slalom:
Standings after 1 run: (1) Elisabeth Görgl  1:15.12 (2) Taïna Barioz  +0.02 (3) Kathrin Zettel  +0.16
The second run is postponed due to bad weather and rescheduled to February 25.
Ice hockey – Men:
Quarterfinals:
 2–0 
 3–7 
 2–0 
 3–4 
Curling – Men:
Tie-breaker: Sweden (Edin) 7–6 Great Britain (Murdoch)

February 23, 2010 (Tuesday)

Basketball
ULEB Eurocup Last 16, matchday 4 (teams clinching a quarterfinal berth in bold; teams eliminated in strike):
Group I:
Aris BSA 2003  80–67   ALBA Berlin
DKV Joventut   80–73  Le Mans
Standings: Joventut 3–1; Aris, ALBA 2–2; Le Mans 1–3.
Group J:
Hapoel Jerusalem  82–73   UNICS Kazan
Power Elec Valencia   98–95  Galatasaray Café Crown (OT)
Standings: Hapoel, Valencia 3–1; UNICS 2–2; Galatasaray 0–4.
Group K:Bizkaia Bilbao Basket  76–66   Brose Baskets
Benetton Basket   81–85  Panellinios BC
Standings: Bilbao 4–0, Panellinios 3–1, Brose 1–3, Benetton 0–4.
Group L:
ČEZ Nymburk  79–71   Gran Canaria 2014 (OT)
Crvena zvezda   76–78  Türk Telekom
Standings: Crvena zvezda 3–1; Gran Canaria 2014, Nymburk 2–2; Türk Telekom 1–3.

Cricket
West Indies in Australia:
2nd T20I in Hobart:
 138/7 (20 overs);  142/2 (11.4 overs). Australia win by 8 wickets, win the 2-match series 2–0.ICC Intercontinental Cup, day 4:
 566 (151.5 overs) and 191/4d (40.0 overs);  264 (79.0 overs) and 494/4 (106.4 overs, Mohammad Shahzad 215*) in Sharjah, United Arab Emirates. Afghanistan win by 6 wickets. 385 (105.1 overs) and 367/6d (91.0 overs);  433 (110.0 overs) and 320/5 (62.0 overs) in Nairobi. Kenya win by 5 wickets.Standings: Afghanistan 57 points (4 matches),  49 (3), Kenya 43 (5),  XI 23 (2), Netherlands 15 (3),  12 (3), Canada 9 (4).

Football (soccer)
UEFA Champions League Round of 16, first leg:
Stuttgart  1–1  Barcelona
Olympiacos  0–1  Bordeaux
UEFA Europa League Round of 32, second leg: (first leg score in parentheses)
Benfica  4–0 (1–1)  Hertha BSC. Benfica win 5–1 on aggregate.
AFC Champions League, Round 1:
Group A:
Al-Jazira  1–2  Al-Gharafa
Al-Ahli  1–2  Esteghlal
Group B:
Bunyodkor  3–0  Al-Ittihad
Zob Ahan  1–0  Al-Wahda
Group E:
Seongnam Ilhwa Chunma  2–0  Kawasaki Frontale
Beijing Guoan  1–0  Melbourne Victory
Group F:
Persipura Jayapura  1–4  Jeonbuk Hyundai Motors
Kashima Antlers  1–0  Changchun Yatai
Copa Libertadores Second Stage:
Group 5: Internacional  2–1  Emelec
Group 6: Morelia  0–0  Nacional
Standings (after 2 matches): Banfield 6 points, Nacional 4, Morelia 1, Deportivo Cuenca 0.
Group 7: Deportivo Italia  0–1  Vélez Sársfield
Standings: Vélez Sársfield 6 points (2 matches), Colo-Colo 3 (1), Cruzeiro 0 (1), Deportivo Italia 0 (2)

Olympic Games
Winter Olympics in Vancouver, British Columbia, Canada:
Alpine skiing – Men's giant slalom:  Carlo Janka  2:37.83  Kjetil Jansrud  +0.39  Aksel Lund Svindal  +0.61
Biathlon – Women's relay:  Svetlana Sleptsova/Anna Bogaliy-Titovets/Olga Medvedtseva/Olga Zaitseva   1:09:36.3 (5 penalties)  Marie-Laure Brunet/Sylvie Becaert/Marie Dorin/Sandrine Bailly  +32.8 (10)  Kati Wilhelm/Simone Hauswald/Martina Beck/Andrea Henkel  +37.1 (5)
Wilhelm wins the seventh medal of her career.
Beck and Henkel both win the fourth medal of their career.
Freestyle skiing – Women's ski cross:  Ashleigh McIvor   Hedda Berntsen   Marion Josserand 
Nordic combined – Team large hill/4 x 5 km:  Mario Stecher/David Kreiner/Bernhard Gruber/Felix Gottwald  49:31.6  Brett Camerota/Todd Lodwick/Bill Demong/Johnny Spillane  +5.2  Tino Edelmann/Johannes Rydzek/Björn Kircheisen/Eric Frenzel  +19.5
Gottwald wins the third title and seventh medal of his career.
Speed skating – Men's 10000 metres:  Lee Seung-hoon  12:58.55 OR  Ivan Skobrev  +3.52  Bob de Jong  +8.18
Figure skating – Women's short program: (1) Kim Yuna  78.50 WR (2) Mao Asada  73.78 (3) Joannie Rochette  71.36
Kim sets a world record for the short program, improving her previous mark of 76.28.
Bobsleigh – Two-woman:
Standings after 2 runs: (1) Kaillie Humphries/Heather Moyse  1:46.20 (2) Helen Upperton/Shelley-Ann Brown  +0.13 (3) Cathleen Martini/Romy Logsch  +0.40
Ice hockey – Men:
Qualification playoffs:
 3–2 (SO) 
 8–2 
 3–2 (OT) 
 4–3 
Curling – Men: (teams in bold advance to the semifinals, teams in italics secure tie-breakers)
Draw 12:
China (Wang) 3–10 Canada (Martin)
Sweden (Edin) 7–6 Denmark (Schmidt)
Great Britain (Murdoch) 5–9 Norway (Ulsrud)Switzerland (Stöckli) 6–2 France (Dufour)
Final standings: Canada 9–0, Norway 7–2, Switzerland 6–3, Great Britain, Sweden 5–4, Germany 4–5, France 3–6, China, Denmark, United States 2–7.
Curling – Women: (teams in bold advance to the semifinals)
Draw 11:
Japan (Meguro) 6–10 Sweden (Norberg)Switzerland (Ott) 4–2 Germany (Schöpp)
United States (McCormick) 5–6 China (Wang)Canada (Bernard) 6–5 Great Britain (Muirhead)
Draw 12:Switzerland (Ott) 10–3 United States (McCormick)Canada (Bernard) 7–3 Russia (Privivkova)
Japan (Meguro) 4–7 Denmark (Jensen)Sweden (Norberg) 8–7 Germany (Schöpp)
Final standings: Canada 8–1, Sweden 7–2, China, Switzerland 6–3, Denmark 4–5, Germany, Japan, Russia, Great Britain 3–6, United States 2–7.

February 22, 2010 (Monday)

Cricket
ICC Intercontinental Cup, day 3:
 566 (151.5 overs) and 191/4d (40.0 overs);  264 (79.0 overs) and 40/0 (13.0 overs) in Sharjah, United Arab Emirates. Afghanistan require another 454 runs with 10 wickets remaining.
 385 (105.1 overs) and 178/0 (53.0 overs);  433 (110.0 overs) in Nairobi. Netherlands lead by 130 runs with 10 wickets remaining in the 2nd innings.

Olympic Games
Winter Olympics in Vancouver, British Columbia, Canada:
Cross-country skiing – Men's team sprint:  Øystein Pettersen/Petter Northug  19:01.0  Tim Tscharnke/Axel Teichmann  +1.3  Nikolay Morilov/Alexey Petukhov  +1.5
Cross-country skiing – Women's team sprint:  Evi Sachenbacher-Stehle/Claudia Nystad  18:03.7  Charlotte Kalla/Anna Haag  +0.6  Irina Khazova/Natalya Korostelyova  +4.0
Figure skating – Ice dancing:  Tessa Virtue/Scott Moir  221.57 points  Meryl Davis/Charlie White  215.74  Oksana Domnina/Maxim Shabalin  207.64
Virtue/Moir are the first non-European dance couple to win the Olympic title, and also the youngest ever champions in this event.
Ski jumping – Large hill team:  Wolfgang Loitzl/Andreas Kofler/Thomas Morgenstern/Gregor Schlierenzauer  1107.9  Michael Neumayer/Andreas Wank/Martin Schmitt/Michael Uhrmann  1035.8  Anders Bardal/Tom Hilde/Johan Remen Evensen/Anders Jacobsen  1030.3
Schlierenzauer wins his third medal of the Games.
Morgenstern wins the third title of his career.
Kofler wins the second title and third medal of his career.
Ice hockey – Women:
Seventh place game:
 3–1 
Fifth place game:
 2–1 (SO) 
Semifinals:
 1–9 
 0–5 
Curling – Men: (teams in bold advance to the semifinals, teams in italics secure at least tie-breakers, teams in strike are eliminated from semifinal contention)
Draw 10:
France (Dufour) 2–9 Norway (Ulsrud)Canada (Martin) 7–2 United States (Shuster)
Germany (Kapp) 7–6 China (Wang)
Switzerland (Stöckli) 7–3 Sweden (Edin)
Draw 11:
Germany (Kapp) 2–8 Great Britain (Murdoch)
France (Dufour) 6–5 Denmark (Schmidt)
China (Wang) 11–5 United States (Shuster)
Standings (after draw 11): Canada 8–0, Norway 6–2, Switzerland, Great Britain 5–3, Sweden 4–4, Germany 4–5, France 3–5, Denmark, China 2–6, United States 2–7.
Curling – Women:
Draw 10: (teams in bold advance to the semifinals, teams in italics secure at least tie-breakers, teams in strike are eliminated from semifinal contention)
Russia (Privivkova) 7–4 China (Wang)
Japan (Meguro) 4–10 Switzerland (Ott)
Sweden (Norberg) 2–6 Canada (Bernard)
Great Britain (Muirhead) 8–9 Denmark (Jensen)
Standings (after draw 10): Canada 6–1, Sweden 5–2, China 5–3, Switzerland 4–3, Japan, Germany 3–4, Russia, Great Britain, Denmark 3–5, United States 2–5.

February 21, 2010 (Sunday)

Auto racing
NASCAR Sprint Cup Series:
Auto Club 500 in Fontana, California:
 (1)  Jimmie Johnson (Chevrolet, Hendrick Motorsports) (2)  Kevin Harvick (Chevrolet, Richard Childress Racing) (3)  Jeff Burton (Chevrolet, Richard Childress Racing)
Drivers' standings (after 2 of 36 races): (1) Harvick 331 points (2)  Clint Bowyer (Chevrolet, Richard Childress Racing) 312 (3)  Greg Biffle (Ford, Roush Fenway Racing) 304

Basketball
ASEAN Basketball League Finals:
Philippine Patriots  75–67  Satria Muda BritAma, Patriots win series 3–0.
 Spanish Cup Final in Bilbao:FC Barcelona 80–61 Real Madrid
Barcelona win the Cup for the 21st time.
 Italian Cup Final in Casalecchio:Montepaschi Siena 83–75 Virtus Bologna
Siena win the Cup for the second straight time and second time overall.
 Turkish Cup Final:
Mersin 68–72 Fenerbahçe ÜlkerFenerbahçe Ülker win the Cup for the second time.
 Serbian Cup Final:Partizan 72–62 FMP
Partizan win the Cup for the third straight time and 11th time overall.
 Semaine des As Cup Final:ASVEL Villeurbanne 70–69 Orléans
ASVEL win the trophy for the first time.
 Polish Cup Final:
Turów Zgorzelec 75–80 AZS KoszalinCricket
South Africa In India:
1st ODI in Jaipur
 298/9 (50.0 overs);  297 (50.0 overs). India win by 1 run, lead the 3-match series 1–0.West Indies in Australia:
1st T20I in Hobart
 179/8 (20.0 overs);  141/8 (20.0 overs). Australia win by 38 runs, lead the 2-match series 1–0.ICC Intercontinental Cup, day 2:
 566 (151.5 overs, S Dhaniram 130);  110/3 (40.0 overs) in Sharjah, United Arab Emirates. Afghanistan trail by 456 runs with 7 wickets remaining in the 1st innings.
 385 (105.1 overs, RN ten Doeschate 212*);  235/2 (56.0 overs, DO Obuya 115*) in Nairobi. Kenya trail by 150 runs with 8 wickets remaining in the 1st innings.

Golf
 World Golf Championships:
 WGC-Accenture Match Play Championship in Marana, Arizona, United States:
 Final: Ian Poulter  def. Paul Casey  4 & 2
 Poulter collects his first WGC title, which is also his first on the PGA Tour and ninth on the European Tour.
 Consolation Match: Camilo Villegas  def. Sergio García  5 & 4
PGA Tour:
Mayakoba Golf Classic at Riviera Maya in Cancún, Mexico:
Winner: Cameron Beckman  269 (−15)
Beckman wins his third PGA Tour title.
LPGA Tour:
Honda PTT LPGA Thailand in Chonburi, Thailand:
Winner: Ai Miyazato  267 (−21)
Miyazato wins her second LPGA Tour title.
Champions Tour:
Allianz Championship in Boca Raton, Florida:
Winner: Bernhard Langer  199 (−17)
Langer wins his ninth Champions Tour title.

Mixed martial arts
UFC 110 in Sydney, Australia:
Preliminary Card:
Light Heavyweight Bout: James Te-Huna  def. Igor Pokrajac  via TKO (strikes) in round 3
Middleweight Bout: C.B. Dollaway  def. Goran Reljic  via unanimous decision (29–28, 29–28, 29–28)
Welterweight Bout: Chris Lytle  def. Brian Foster  via submission (kneebar) at 1:41 of round 1
Light Heavyweight Bout: Krzysztof Soszynski  def. Stephan Bonnar  via TKO (cut) at 1:04 of round 3
Main Card:
Heavyweight Bout: Mirko Filipović  def. Anthony Perosh  via TKO (doctor stoppage) at 5:00 of round 2
Light Heavyweight Bout: Ryan Bader  def. Keith Jardine  via KO (punch) at 2:10 of round 3
Lightweight Bout: George Sotiropoulos  def. Joe Stevenson  via unanimous decision (30–27, 30–27, 30–27)
Middleweight Bout: Wanderlei Silva  def.  Michael Bisping  via unanimous decision (29–28, 29–28, 29–28)
Heavyweight Bout: Cain Velasquez  def. Antônio Rodrigo Nogueira  via KO (punches) at 2:20 of round 1

Olympic Games
Winter Olympics in Vancouver, British Columbia, Canada:
Alpine skiing – Men's combined:  Bode Miller  2:44.92  Ivica Kostelić  +0.33  Silvan Zurbriggen  +0.40
Miller wins his third medal of the Games and the fifth of his career.
Biathlon – Men's mass start:  Evgeny Ustyugov  35:35.7 (0 penalties)  Martin Fourcade  +10.5 (3)  Pavol Hurajt  +16.6 (0)
Biathlon – Women's mass start:  Magdalena Neuner  35:19.6 (2 penalties)  Olga Zaitseva  +5.5 (1)  Simone Hauswald  +7.3 (2)
Neuner wins her second title and third medal of the Games.
Bobsleigh – Two-man:  André Lange/Kevin Kuske  3:26.65  Andre Florschütz/Richard Adjei  +0.22  Alexandr Zubkov/Alexey Voyevoda  +0.86
Lange and Kuske win their fourth Olympic titles – two each in two-man and four-man.
Freestyle skiing – Men's ski cross:  Michael Schmid   Andreas Matt   Audun Grønvold 
Ski cross is a new event on the Olympic program.
Speed skating – Women's 1500 metres:  Ireen Wüst  1:56.89  Kristina Groves  +0.25  Martina Sáblíková  +1.07
Figure skating – Ice dancing:
Standings after Original Dance: (1) Tessa Virtue/Scott Moir  111.15 points (2) Meryl Davis/Charlie White  108.55 (3) Oksana Domnina/Maxim Shabalin  106.60
Ice hockey – Men: (teams in bold advance to the quarter-finals)
Group A:
 3–5 Final standings: United States 9 points, Canada 5, Switzerland 3, Norway 1.
Group B: 4–2 
Final standings: Russia 7 points, Czech Republic 6, Slovakia 5, Latvia 0.
Group C: 3–0 Final standings: Sweden 9 points, Finland 6, Belarus 3, Germany 0.
Preliminary standings: 1. United States 2. Sweden 3. Russia 4. Finland 5. Czech Republic 6. Canada 7. Slovakia 8. Switzerland 9. Belarus 10. Norway 11. Germany 12. Latvia
Curling – Men:
Draw 9: (teams in bold advance to the semifinals)
United States (Shuster) 2–4 Great Britain (Murdoch)
Norway (Ulsrud) 7–8 Sweden (Edin)
Switzerland (Stöckli) 4–6 Canada (Martin)
Denmark (Schmidt) 9–5 Germany (Kapp)
Standings (after draw 9): Canada 7–0, Norway 5–2, Switzerland, Great Britain, Sweden 4–3, Germany 3–4, France 2–4, United States, Denmark 2–5, China 1–5.
Curling – Women:
Draw 8:
Great Britain (Muirhead) 6–10 Switzerland (Ott)
Germany (Schöpp) 5–6 Denmark (Jensen)
Canada (Bernard) 9–2 United States (McCormick)
Russia (Privivkova) 9–12 Japan (Meguro)
Draw 9:
China (Wang) 6–5 Canada (Bernard)
Japan (Meguro) 6–7 Germany (Schöpp)
United States (McCormick) 3–9 Sweden (Norberg)
Standings (after draw 9): Canada, Sweden 5–1, China 5–2, Japan, Switzerland 3–3, Great Britain, Germany 3–4, Denmark, Russia, United States 2–5.

Tennis
ATP World Tour:
Regions Morgan Keegan Championships in Memphis, United States:
Final: Sam Querrey  def. John Isner  6–7(3), 7–6(5), 6–3
Querrey wins the third title of his career.
Open 13 in Marseille, France:
Final: Michaël Llodra  def. Julien Benneteau  6–3, 6–4
Llodra wins the fourth title of his career.
Copa Telmex in Buenos Aires, Argentina:
Final: Juan Carlos Ferrero  def. David Ferrer  5–6, 6–4, 6–3
Ferrero wins the 14th title of his career.
WTA Tour:
Copa Sony Ericsson Colsanitas in Bogotá, Colombia:Mariana Duque Mariño  def. Angelique Kerber   6–4, 6–3
Duque Marino wins her first career title.

February 20, 2010 (Saturday)

Auto racing
Nationwide Series:
Stater Bros 300 in Fontana, California:
 (1)  Kyle Busch (Toyota, Joe Gibbs Racing) (2)  Greg Biffle (Ford, Baker-Curb Racing) (3)  Brad Keselowski (Dodge, Penske Racing)
Drivers' standings (after 2 of 35 races): (1)  Carl Edwards (Ford, Roush Fenway Racing) 335 points (2)  Joey Logano (Toyota, Joe Gibbs Racing) 311 (3) Busch 304
V8 Supercars:
Yas V8 400 in Abu Dhabi, United Arab Emirates:
Race 2: (1) Jamie Whincup  (Holden Commodore) (2) Mark Winterbottom  (Ford Falcon) (3) Shane van Gisbergen  (Ford Falcon)
Drivers' standings (after 2 of 26 races): (1) Whincup 300 points (2) Winterbottom 267 (3) Craig Lowndes  (Holden Commodore) 249

Basketball
 Greek Cup Final in Ellinikon, Athens:Olympiacos 68–64 Panathinaikos
Olympiacos, runner-up to arch rival Panathinaikos in previous two finals, win the Cup for the eighth time.

Cricket
England v Pakistan in UAE:
2nd T20I in Dubai
 148/6 (20.0 overs);  149/6 (19.0 overs). Pakistan win by 4 wickets. 2-match series drawn 1–1.ICC Intercontinental Cup, day 1:
 350/6 (98.0 overs);  in Sharjah, United Arab Emirates
 276/6 (74.0 overs, RN ten Doeschate 129*);  in Nairobi.

Football (soccer)
OFC Champions League Group stage, Matchday 4:
Group A: Waitakere United  4–1  AS Magenta
Standings (after 4 matches): Auckland City FC 10 points, Waitakere United 8, AS Magenta 2, AS Manu-Ura 1.

Handball
African Men's Championship in Egypt: (teams in bold qualify for 2011 World Championship)
Bronze medal match:  22–30  Gold medal match:   24–21  Tunisia win the title for the eighth time.
African Women's Championship in Egypt: (teams in bold qualify for 2011 World Championship)
Bronze medal match:   32–28 
Gold medal match:   31–30  Angola win the title for the seventh straight time and the tenth time overall.

Olympic Games
Winter Olympics in Vancouver, British Columbia, Canada:
Alpine skiing – Women's super-G:  Andrea Fischbacher  1:20.14  Tina Maze  +0.49   Lindsey Vonn  +0.74
Cross-country skiing – Men's 30 kilometre pursuit:  Marcus Hellner  1:15:11.4  Tobias Angerer  +2.1   Johan Olsson  +2.8
Angerer wins the fourth medal of his career.
Short track speed skating – Women's 1500 metres:  Zhou Yang  2:16.993 OR  Lee Eun-byul  +0.856   Park Seung-hi  +0.934
Short track speed skating – Men's 1000 metres:  Lee Jung-su  1:23.747 OR  Lee Ho-suk  +0.054   Apolo Ohno  +0.381
Lee Jung-su wins his second title of the Games.
Ohno wins his seventh Olympic medal and becomes the most decorated American in Winter Olympics.
Ski jumping – Large hill individual:  Simon Ammann  283.6 points  Adam Małysz  269.4   Gregor Schlierenzauer  262.2
Ammann wins his second title of the Games and becomes the first ski jumper in history to win four individual Olympic gold medals.
Małysz wins the fourth medal of his career.
Speed skating – Men's 1500 metres:  Mark Tuitert  1:45.57  Shani Davis  +0.13   Håvard Bøkko  +0.22
Davis wins the fourth medal of his career.
Bobsleigh – Two-man:
Standings after 2 runs: (1) André Lange/Kevin Kuske  1:43.31 (2) Andre Florschütz/Richard Adjei  +0.11 (3) Alexandr Zubkov/Alexey Voyevoda  +0.50
Ice hockey – Men:
Group A:
 4–5 (OT) 
Standings: United States 6 points (2 games), Canada 5 (2), Switzerland 3 (3), Norway 1 (3).
Group B:
 0–6 
Standings: Czech Republic 6 points (3 games), Slovakia 5 (3), Russia 4 (2), Latvia 0 (3).
Group C:
 3–5 
Standings: Sweden, Finland 6 points (2 matches), Belarus 3 (3), Germany 0 (3).
Ice hockey – Women:
Fifth place semifinals:
 6–0 
 4–2 
Curling – Men:
Draw 7:
Norway (Ulsrud) 6–3 Denmark (Schmidt)
France (Dufour) 4–9 Germany (Kapp)
China (Wang) 4–9 Great Britain (Murdoch)
Sweden (Edin) 7–8 United States (Shuster)
Draw 8:
Switzerland (Stöckli) 9–5 China (Wang)
Sweden (Edin) 4–5 France (Dufour)
Canada (Martin) 7–6 Great Britain (Murdoch)
Standings (after draw 8): Canada 6–0, Norway 5–1, Switzerland 4–2, Great Britain, Germany, Sweden 3–3, France, United States 2–4, China, Denmark 1–5.
Curling – Women:
Draw 7:
Sweden (Norberg) 1–10 Russia (Privivkova)
United States (McCormick) 6–5 Great Britain (Muirhead)
Denmark (Jensen) 7–8 Switzerland (Ott)
Germany (Schöpp) 7–9 China (Wang)
Standings (after draw 7): Canada 4–0, Sweden 4–1, China 4–2, Great Britain 3–3, Japan 2–2, Germany, United States, Switzerland 2–3, Russia 2–4, Denmark 1–5.

Tennis
WTA Tour:
Dubai Tennis Championships in Dubai, United Arab Emirates:
Final: Venus Williams  def. Victoria Azarenka  6–3, 7–5
Williams wins the 42nd title of her career, and her second consecutive title at the event.
Cellular South Cup in Memphis, United States:
Final: Maria Sharapova  def. Sofia Arvidsson  6–2, 6–1
Sharapova wins the 20th title of her career.

February 19, 2010 (Friday)

Auto racing
V8 Supercars:
Yas V8 400 in Abu Dhabi, United Arab Emirates:
Race 1: (1) Jamie Whincup  (Holden Commodore) (2) Craig Lowndes  (Holden Commodore) (3) Mark Winterbottom  (Ford Falcon)
Drivers' standings (after 1 of 26 races): (1) Whincup 150 points (2) Lowndes 138 (3) Winterbottom 129

Cricket
Bangladesh in New Zealand:
Only Test in Hamilton, day 5:
 553/7d (135 overs) and 258/5d (71.0 overs);  408 (97.3 overs) and 282 (76.0 overs, Shakib Al Hasan 100). New Zealand win by 121 runs, win the 1-match series 1–0.West Indies in Australia:
5th ODI in Melbourne
 324/5 (50.0 overs);  199 (36.5 overs). Australia win by 125 runs, win the 5-match series 4–0.England v Pakistan in UAE:
1st T20I in Dubai
 129/8 (20 overs);  130/3 (18.3 overs). England win by 7 wickets, lead the 2-match series 1–0.Handball
Asian Men's Championship in Beirut, Lebanon: (teams in bold qualify for 2011 World Championship)
Bronze medal match:  30–33 (OT)  Gold medal match:   25–32  South Korea win the title for the second straight time and the eighth time overall.
African Men's Championship in Egypt:
Semifinals: (the winners qualify for 2011 World Championship)
 37–22 
 26–24 

Olympic Games
Winter Olympics in Vancouver, British Columbia, Canada:
Alpine skiing – Men's super-G:  Aksel Lund Svindal  1:30.34  Bode Miller  +0.28  Andrew Weibrecht  +0.31
Cross-country – Women's 15 kilometre pursuit:  Marit Bjørgen  39:58.1  Anna Haag  +8.9  Justyna Kowalczyk  +9.3
Bjørgen wins her second Olympic title and the third medal of these Games.
Skeleton – Men:  Jon Montgomery  3:29.73  Martins Dukurs  +0.07  Aleksandr Tretyakov  +1.02
Skeleton – Women:  Amy Williams  3:35.64  Kerstin Szymkowiak  +0.56  Anja Huber  +0.72
Figure skating – Ice dancing:
Standings after Compulsory Dance: (1) Oksana Domnina/Maxim Shabalin  43.76 (2) Tessa Virtue/Scott Moir  (3) Meryl Davis/Charlie White  41.47
Ice hockey – Men:
Group B:
 5–2 
Standings: Czech Republic 6 points, Russia 4, Slovakia 2, Latvia 0.
Group C:
 2–4 
 5–0 
Standings: Sweden, Finland 6 points, Germany, Belarus 0.
Curling – Men:
Draw 6:
Germany 7–6 Switzerland
Denmark 3–10 Canada
France 3–4 United States
Norway 7–5 China
Standings (after draw 6): Canada 5–0, Norway 4–1, Sweden 3–1, Switzerland 3–2, Great Britain 2–2, Germany 2–3, France, China 1–3, Denmark, United States 1–4.
Curling – Women:
Draw 5:
Germany 4–7 Great Britain
Russia 4–6 United States
China 11–1 Denmark
Draw 6:
Denmark 4–5 Canada
Sweden 6–4 China
Great Britain 4–11 Japan
Switzerland 8–5 Russia
Standings (after draw 6): Canada, Sweden 4–0, China, Great Britain 3–2, Germany, Japan 2–2, United States, Switzerland 1–3, Russia, Denmark 1–4.

February 18, 2010 (Thursday)

Basketball
 State Cup Final in Tel Aviv:Maccabi Tel Aviv 77–70 Bnei HaSharon
Maccabi Tel Aviv win the Cup for the first time in four years and the 37th time overall.

Cricket
South Africa In India:
2nd Test in Kolkata, day 5:
 296 (85 overs) and 289 (131.3 overs, Hashim Amla 127*);  643/6d (153 overs). India win by an innings and 58 runs. 2-match series drawn 1–1.
Bangladesh in New Zealand:
Only Test in Hamilton, day 4:
 553/7d (135 overs) and 258/5d (71.0 overs);  408 (97.3 overs) and 88/5 (30.0 overs). Bangladesh require another 316 runs with 5 wickets remaining.
Netherlands in Kenya:
2nd ODI in Nairobi:
 200 (48.4 overs);  120 (32.0 overs). Netherlands win by 80 runs. 2-match series drawn 1–1.
Canada vs Afghanistan in UAE:
2nd ODI in Sharjah:
 177 (43.1 overs);  178/6 (39.2 overs). Canada win by 4 wickets. 2-match series drawn 1–1.

Darts
Premier League round 2 in Bournemouth, England:
Adrian Lewis  8–3 Raymond van Barneveld 
Terry Jenkins  7–7 Simon Whitlock 
Phil Taylor  8–6 Ronnie Baxter 
James Wade   4–8 Mervyn King 
High Checkout: Adrian Lewis 121
Standings: Taylor, King 4 points, Lewis, Jenkins, van Barneveld 2, Baxter, Whitlock 1, Wade 0.

Football (soccer)
UEFA Europa League Round of 32, first leg:
Rubin Kazan  3–0  Hapoel Tel Aviv
Ajax  1–2  Juventus
Club Brugge  1–0  Valencia
Twente  1–0  Werder Bremen
Lille  2–1  Fenerbahçe
Standard Liège  3–2  Red Bull Salzburg
Villarreal  2–2  Wolfsburg
Athletic Bilbao  1–1  Anderlecht
Atlético Madrid  1–1  Galatasaray
Copenhagen  1–3  Marseille
Fulham  2–1  Shakhtar Donetsk
Hamburg  1–0  PSV Eindhoven
Hertha BSC  1–1  Benfica
Liverpool  1–0  Unirea Urziceni
Panathinaikos  3–2  Roma
Copa Libertadores Second Stage:
Group 3: Alianza Lima  4–1  Estudiantes
Standings: Alianza Lima 6 points (2 matches), Estudiantes 3 (2), Bolívar, Juan Aurich 0 (1).
Group 8: Universidad de Chile  1–0  Caracas
Standings: Universidad de Chile 3 points (1 match), Flamengo, Universidad Católica 0 (0), Caracas 0 (1)

Handball
African Women's Championship in Egypt:
Semifinals: (the winners qualify for 2011 World Championship)
 24–27 
 16–36 

Olympic Games
Winter Olympics in Vancouver, British Columbia, Canada:
Alpine skiing – Women's combined:  Maria Riesch  2:09.14  Julia Mancuso  +0.94  Anja Pärson  +1.05
Pärson wins the sixth medal of her career.
Biathlon – Women's individual:  Tora Berger  40:52.8 (1 shot missed)  Elena Khrustaleva  +20.7 (0)  Darya Domracheva  +28.2 (1)
Berger wins the 100th gold medal for Norway in Winter Olympics history.
Biathlon – Men's individual:  Emil Hegle Svendsen  48:22.5 (1 shot missed)  Ole Einar Bjørndalen  +9.5 (2)  Sergei Novikov  +9.5 (0)
Bjørndalen wins the tenth medal of his career.
Figure skating – Men:  Evan Lysacek  257.67  Evgeni Plushenko  256.36  Daisuke Takahashi  247.23
Lysacek wins the first gold medal for USA in the men's event since Brian Boitano in 1988, which was also the last time a Russian or Soviet skater didn't win the title.
Takahashi becomes the first Japanese medallist in men's figure skating.
Snowboarding – Women's halfpipe:  Torah Bright  45.0  Hannah Teter  42.4  Kelly Clark  42.2
Speed skating – Women's 1000 metres:  Christine Nesbitt  1:16.56  Annette Gerritsen  +0.02  Laurine van Riessen  +0.16
Skeleton – Men:
Standings after 2 runs: (1) Martins Dukurs  1:44.91 (2) Jon Montgomery  +0.26 (3) Aleksandr Tretyakov  +0.84
Skeleton – Women:
Standings after 2 runs: (1) Amy Williams  1:47.96 (2) Kerstin Szymkowiak  +0.30 (3) Mellisa Hollingsworth  +0.39
Ice hockey – Men:
Group A:
 6–1 
 2–3 (SO) 
Standings (after 2 games): United States 6 points, Canada 5, Switzerland 1, Norway 0.
Group B:
 2–1 (SO) 
Standings: Russia 4 points (2 games), Czech Republic 3 (1), Slovakia 2 (2), Latvia 0 (1).
Ice hockey – Women:
Group B: (teams in bold advance to the semifinals) 6–0  1–2 
Final standings: USA 9 points, Finland 6 points, Russia 3, China 0.
Curling – Men:
Draw 4:
Denmark (Schmidt) 7–6 United States (Shuster)
Germany (Kapp) 4–7 Norway (Ulsrud)
Canada (Martin) 7–3 Sweden (Edin)
Great Britain (Murdoch) 3–4 Switzerland (Stöckli)
Draw 5:
Sweden (Edin) 6–5 China (Wang)
Great Britain (Murdoch) 9–4 Denmark (Schmidt)
Norway (Ulsrud) 7–4 Switzerland (Stöckli)
France (Dufour) 5–10 Canada (Martin)
Standings (after draw 5): Canada 4–0, Switzerland, Sweden, Norway 3–1, Great Britain 2–2, France, China 1–2, Denmark, Germany 1–3, United States 0–4.
Curling – Women:
Draw 4:
Canada (Bernard) 6–5 Germany (Schöpp)
China (Wang) 9–5 Japan (Meguro)
Russia (Privivkova) 3–10 Great Britain (Muirhead)
Denmark (Jensen) 7–6 United States (McCormick)
Standings (after draw 4): Sweden, Canada 3–0, China, Germany, Great Britain 2–1, Japan, Denmark, Russia 1–2, United States, Switzerland 0–3.

Snooker
Pro Challenge Series – Event 5 in Liverpool, England:
Final: Barry Hawkins  def. Michael Holt  5–1

February 17, 2010 (Wednesday)

Cricket
South Africa In India:
2nd Test in Kolkata, day 4:
 296 (85 overs) and 115/3 (35.0 overs);  643/6d (153 overs). South Africa trail by 232 runs with 7 wickets remaining
Bangladesh in New Zealand:
Only Test in Hamilton, day 3:
 553/7d (135 overs) and 9/1 (5.0 overs);  408 (97.3 overs, Mahmudullah 115). New Zealand lead by 154 runs with 9 wickets remaining

Football (soccer)
UEFA Champions League Round of 16, first leg:
Porto  2–1  Arsenal
Bayern Munich  2–1  Fiorentina
Copa Libertadores Second Stage:
Group 4: Universitario  2–0  Lanús
Standings (after 2 matches): Libertad, Universitario 6 points, Lanús, Blooming 0.
Group 6: Deportivo Cuenca  1–4  Banfield
Standings: Banfield 6 points (2 matches), Nacional 3 (1), Morelia 0 (1), Deportivo Cuenca 0 (2).

Handball
Asian Men's Championship in Beirut, Lebanon:
Semifinals: (the winners qualify for 2011 World Championship)
 25–26 
 30–23 
African Men's Championship in Egypt: (teams in bold advance to the semifinals.)
Group D: 21–21 Final standings: Tunisia, Algeria 3 points, Angola 0
Group E:
 28–30 Final standings: Egypt 4 points, Congo DR 2, Morocco 0

Olympic Games
Winter Olympics in Vancouver, British Columbia, Canada:
Alpine skiing – Women's downhill:  Lindsey Vonn  1:44.19   Julia Mancuso  +0.56  Elisabeth Görgl  +1.46
Cross-country skiing – Men's sprint:  Nikita Kriukov  3:36.3   Alexander Panzhinskiy  +0.0  Petter Northug  +9.2
Cross-country skiing – Women's sprint:  Marit Bjørgen  3:39.2  Justyna Kowalczyk  +1.1  Petra Majdič  +1.8
Luge – Doubles:  Andreas Linger/Wolfgang Linger  1:22.705  Andris Sics/Juris Sics  +0.264  Patric Leitner/Alexander Resch  +0.335
Short track speed skating – Women's 500 metres:  Wang Meng  43.048  Marianne St-Gelais  +0.659  Arianna Fontana  +0.756
Snowboarding – Men's halfpipe:  Shaun White  48.4  Peetu Piiroinen  45.0  Scotty Lago  42.8
Speed skating – Men's 1000 metres:  Shani Davis  1:08.94  Mo Tae-bum  +0.18  Chad Hedrick  +0.38
Ice hockey – Men:
Group B:
 3–1 
Group C:
 5–1 
 2–0 
Ice hockey – Women:
Group A: (teams in bold advance to the semifinals) 13–1  2–5 
Final standings: Canada 9 points, Sweden 6, Switzerland 3, Slovakia 0.
Curling – Men:
Draw 3:
Great Britain (Murdoch) 9–4 France (Dufour)
United States (Shuster) 6–7 Switzerland (Stöckli)
Denmark (Schmidt) 1–8 China (Wang)
Germany (Kapp) 3–6 Sweden (Edin)
Standings (after draw 3): Canada, Sweden, Switzerland 2–0, France, Norway, China, Great Britain 1–1, Germany 1–2, Denmark 0–2, United States 0–3.
Curling – Women:
Draw 2:
China (Wang) 4–5 Great Britain (Muirhead)
Germany (Schöpp) 6–5 United States (McCormick)
Switzerland (Ott) 7–8 Sweden (Norberg)
Japan (Meguro) 6–7 Canada (Bernard)
Draw 3:
Russia (Privivkova) 7–3 Denmark (Jensen)
Great Britain (Muirhead) 4–6 Sweden (Norberg)
China (Wang) 8–6 Switzerland (Ott)
Standings (after draw 3): Sweden 3–0, Canada, Germany 2–0, Japan, China, Russia, Great Britain 1–1, Denmark,  United States 0–2, Switzerland 0–3.

February 16, 2010 (Tuesday)

Cricket
South Africa In India:
2nd Test in Kolkata, day 3:
 296 (85 overs) and 6/0 (0.5 overs);  643/6d (153 overs, V. V. S. Laxman 143, Mahendra Singh Dhoni 132).
Bangladesh in New Zealand:
Only Test in Hamilton, day 2:
 553/7d (135 overs, Martin Guptill 189, Brendon McCullum 185);  87/1 (17.0 overs)
Netherlands in Kenya:
1st ODI in Nairobi:
 219/9 (50 overs, Ryan ten Doeschate 109*);  221/4 (34.5 overs). Kenya win by 6 wickets, lead 2-match series 1–0.Canada vs Afghanistan in UAE:
1st ODI in Sharjah:
 289/6 (50 overs, Mohammad Shahzad 118);  288/7 (50 overs). Afghanistan win by 1 run, lead 2-match series 1–0.Football (soccer)
UEFA Champions League Round of 16, first leg:
Lyon  1–0  Real Madrid
Milan  2–3  Manchester United
UEFA Europa League Round of 32, first leg:
Everton  2–1  Sporting CP
Copa Libertadores Second Stage:
Group 4: Libertad  4–0  Blooming
Group 7: Colo-Colo  1–0  Deportivo Italia

Handball
African Men's Championship in Egypt: (teams in bold advance to the semifinals.)
Group D:
 19–26 Standings: Tunisia, Algeria 2 points (1 match), Angola 0 (2)
Group E: 44–21 
Standings: Egypt 4 points (2 matches), Congo DR, Morocco 0 (1)

Olympic Games
Winter Olympics in Vancouver, British Columbia, Canada:
Alpine skiing – Men's combined: postponed
Biathlon – Women's pursuit:  Magdalena Neuner  30:16.0 (2 penalties)  Anastazia Kuzmina  +12.3 (2)  Marie-Laure Brunet  +28.3 (0)
Biathlon – Men's pursuit:  Björn Ferry  33:38.4 (1 penalty)  Christoph Sumann  +16.5 (2)  Vincent Jay  +28.2 (2)
Luge – Women's singles:  Tatjana Hüfner  2:46.524  Nina Reithmayer  +0.490  Natalie Geisenberger  +0.577
Snowboarding – Women's snowboard cross:  Maëlle Ricker   Déborah Anthonioz   Olivia Nobs 
Speed skating – Women's 500 metres:  Lee Sang-hwa  76.09  Jenny Wolf  76.14  Wang Beixing  76.63
Figure skating – Men's short program: (1) Evgeni Plushenko  90.85 (2) Evan Lysacek  90.30 (3) Daisuke Takahashi  90.25
Ice hockey – Men:
Group A:
 3–1 
 8–0 
Group B:
 8–2 
Ice hockey – Women:
Group B: (teams in bold advance to the semifinals)
 0–13  2–1 
Standings: USA, Finland 6 points, China, Russia 0.
Curling – Men:
Draw 1:
Great Britain (Murdoch) 4–6 Sweden (Edin)
Norway (Ulsrud) 6–7 Canada (Martin)
United States (Shuster) 5–7 Germany (Kapp)
Switzerland (Stöckli) 6–5 Denmark (Schmidt)
Draw 2:
Canada (Martin) 9–4 Germany (Kapp)
China (Wang) 5–6 France (Dufour)
United States (Shuster) 5–6 Norway (Ulsrud)
Standings: Canada 2–0, Sweden, Switzerland, France 1–0, Norway, Germany 1–1, China, Denmark, Great Britain 0–1, United States 0–2.
Curling – Women:
Draw 1:
United States (McCormick) 7–9 Japan (Meguro)
Denmark (Jensen) 5–6 Sweden (Norberg)
Germany (Schöpp) 9–5 Russia (Privivkova)
Canada (Bernard) 5–4 Switzerland (Ott)

February 15, 2010 (Monday)

Cricket
South Africa In India:
2nd Test in Kolkata, day 2:
 296 (85 overs);  342/5 (76 overs, Virender Sehwag 165, Sachin Tendulkar 106). India lead by 46 runs with 5 wickets remaining in the 1st innings
Bangladesh in New Zealand:
Only Test in Hamilton, day 1:
 258/5 (68.1 overs)

Handball
Asian Men's Championship in Beirut, Lebanon: (teams in bold advance to the semifinals)
Group E:
 26–26  36–23 
Final standing: Saudi Arabia 5 points, Japan 4, Qatar 3, Iran 0.
Group F:
 25–35  18–36 Final standing: South Korea 6 points, Bahrain 4, Syria 2, Lebanon 0.
African Men's Championship in Egypt:
Group D:
 33–21 
Standings: Tunisia 2 points (1 match), Algeria 0 (0), Angola 0 (1).
Group E:
 17–32 
Standings: Egypt 2 points (1 match), Morocco 0 (0), Congo DR 0 (1).
African Women's Championship in Egypt:
Quarter-final:
 17–30 
 38–32 
 40–23 
 26–27 

Olympic Games
Winter Olympics in Vancouver, British Columbia, Canada:
Alpine skiing – Men's downhill:  Didier Défago  1:54.31  Aksel Lund Svindal  1:54.38  Bode Miller  1:54.40
Cross-country skiing – Women's 10 kilometre freestyle:  Charlotte Kalla  24:58.4  Kristina Šmigun-Vähi  25:05.0  Marit Bjørgen  25:14.3
Cross-country skiing – Men's 15 kilometre freestyle:  Dario Cologna  33:36.3  Pietro Piller Cottrer   34:00.9  Lukáš Bauer  34:12.0
Figure skating – Pairs:  Shen Xue/Zhao Hongbo  216.57 WR  Pang Qing/Tong Jian  213.31 (Free Skating 141.81 WR)  Aliona Savchenko/Robin Szolkowy  210.60
Shen & Zhao win the first Olympic gold medal for China in figure skating, as Russia or USSR fail to win the pairs title for the first time since 1960.
Snowboarding – Men's snowboard cross:  Seth Wescott   Mike Robertson   Tony Ramoin 
Speed skating – Men's 500 metres:  Mo Tae-bum  69.82  Keiichiro Nagashima  69.98  Joji Kato  70.01
Ice hockey – Women:
Group A: (teams in bold advance to the semifinals)
 1–10  6–2 
Standings: Canada, Sweden 6 points, Switzerland, Slovakia 0.
Luge – Women's singles:
Standings after 2 runs: (1) Tatjana Hüfner  1:23.241  (2) Nina Reithmayer  1:23.291 (3) Natalie Geisenberger  1:23.400

February 14, 2010 (Sunday)

Auto racing
NASCAR Sprint Cup Series:
Daytona 500 in Daytona Beach, Florida:
(1) Jamie McMurray  (Chevrolet, Earnhardt Ganassi Racing) (2) Dale Earnhardt Jr.  (Chevrolet, Hendrick Motorsports) (3) Greg Biffle  (Ford, Roush Fenway Racing)
World Rally Championship:
Rally Sweden:  Mikko Hirvonen /Jarmo Lehtinen  (Ford Focus RS WRC 09) 3:09:30.4  Sébastien Loeb /Daniel Elena  (Citroën C4 WRC) 3:10:12.7  Jari-Matti Latvala /Miikka Anttila  (Ford Focus RS WRC 09) 3:10:45.8

Basketball
NBA All-Star Game in Arlington, Texas, United States:
East 141, West 139
In front of a crowd of 108,713, the largest ever to attend a basketball game, Dwyane Wade is named the game MVP.

Cricket
South Africa In India:
2nd Test in Kolkata, day 1:
 266/9 (81.0 overs, Hashim Amla 114, Alviro Petersen 100)
West Indies in Australia:
4th ODI in Brisbane:
 324/7 (50 overs), Ricky Ponting 106;  274/8 (50 overs). Australia win by 50 runs, lead 5-match series 3–0.Football (soccer)
East Asian Men's Football Championship in Tokyo, Japan:
 0–2 
 1–3 
Final standings: China PR 7 points, Korea Republic 6, Japan 4, Hong Kong 0.
China PR win the tournament for the second time.
OFC Champions League Group stage, Matchday 4:
Group B: Lautoka F.C.  3–0  Marist FC
Standings (after 4 matches): Lautoka F.C. 9 points, PRK Hekari United, Tafea FC 7, Marist FC 0.
 A-League:
Sydney FC def. Melbourne Victory 2–0 to win the A-League Premiership.

Golf
PGA Tour:
AT&T Pebble Beach National Pro-Am in Pebble Beach, California:
Winner: Dustin Johnson  270 (−16)
Johnson wins his third PGA Tour title.
European Tour:
Avantha Masters in New Delhi, India:
Winner: Andrew Dodt  274 (−14)
Dodt wins his first European Tour title.
Champions Tour:
The ACE Group Classic in Naples, Florida
Winner: Fred Couples  199 (−17)
In the first full-field event of the Champions Tour season, Couples collects his first victory on the senior circuit in his second start.

Handball
Asian Men's Championship in Beirut, Lebanon: (teams in bold advance to the final round)
Group E:
 21–22 
 26–28 
Standings (after 2 matches): Saudi Arabia 4 points, Japan, Qatar 2, Iran 0.
Group F:
 39–26 
 32–29 
Standings (after 2 matches): South Korea 4 points, Bahrain, Syria 2, Lebanon 0.

Olympic Games
Winter Olympics in Vancouver, British Columbia, Canada:
Alpine skiing – Women's combined: postponed
Biathlon – Men's sprint:  Vincent Jay  24:07.8 (0 penalties)  Emil Hegle Svendsen  24:20.0 (1)  Jakov Fak  24:21.8 (0)
Freestyle skiing – Men's moguls:  Alexandre Bilodeau  26.75  Dale Begg-Smith  26.58  Bryon Wilson  26.08
 Bilodeau becomes the first Canadian to win a gold medal in an Olympics hosted by the country.
Luge – Men's singles:  Felix Loch  3:13.085  David Möller  3:13.764  Armin Zöggeler  3:14.375
Nordic combined – Individual normal hill/10 km:  Jason Lamy-Chappuis  25:47.1  Johnny Spillane  +0.4  Alessandro Pittin  +0.8
Speed skating – Women's 3000 metres:  Martina Sáblíková  4:02.53  Stephanie Beckert  4:04.62  Kristina Groves  4:04.84
Figure skating – Pairs Short program: (1) Shen Xue/Zhao Hongbo  76.66 WR (2) Aliona Savchenko/Robin Szolkowy  75.96 (3) Yuko Kavaguti/Alexander Smirnov  74.16
Shen/Zhao set a new world record in short program, improving their previous mark by 1.3 points.
Ice hockey – Women:
Group B:
 12–1 
 5–1 

Rugby union
Six Nations Championship, week 2:
 12–17  in Rome
Standings (after 2 matches): France, England 4 points, Ireland, Wales 2, Scotland, Italy 0.
IRB Sevens World Series
USA Sevens in Whitney, Nevada:
Cup Final:  12–33 
Standings after 4 of 8 rounds: (1) New Zealand 84 points (2) Samoa 70 (3)  68

Sailing
33rd America's Cup in Valencia, Spain:
Race 2: BMW Oracle Racing  defeat Alinghi  by 5:26 minutes. BMW Oracle Racing win best-of-3 series 2–0.

Tennis
ATP World Tour:
Brasil Open in Costa do Sauípe, Brazil:
Final: Juan Carlos Ferrero  def. Łukasz Kubot , 6–1, 6–0
Ferrero wins his 13th career title.
ABN AMRO World Tennis Tournament in Rotterdam, Netherlands:
Final: Robin Söderling  def. Mikhail Youzhny , 6–4, 2–0, ret.
Söderling wins his fifth career title.
SAP Open in San Jose, United States:
Final: Fernando Verdasco  def. Andy Roddick , 3–6, 6–4, 6–4
Verdasco wins his fourth career title.
WTA Tour:
Open GDF Suez in Paris, France:
Final: Elena Dementieva  def. Lucie Šafářová  6–7(5), 6–1, 6–4
Dementieva wins her 16th career title.
PTT Pattaya Open in Pattaya, Thailand:
Final: Vera Zvonareva  def. Tamarine Tanasugarn , 6–4, 6–4
Zvonareva wins the tenth title of her career, and her second consecutive title at the event.

February 13, 2010 (Saturday)

Auto racing
Nationwide Series:
DRIVE4COPD 300 in Daytona Beach, Florida:
 (1)  Tony Stewart (Chevrolet, Stewart Haas Racing) (2)  Carl Edwards (Ford, Roush Fenway Racing) (3)  Kevin Harvick (Chevrolet, Kevin Harvick Incorporated)
 Danica Patrick is involved in a 12-car crash in her NASCAR debut.

Cricket
ICC World Twenty20 Qualifier in United Arab Emirates:
Super Four: (teams in bold advance to the final and qualify for 2010 ICC World Twenty20)
 100/9 (20 overs);  101/6 (19.3 overs) in Dubai. Afghanistan win by 4 wickets. 151/6 (20 overs);  86 (15.3 overs) in Dubai. Ireland win by 65 runs.
Final standings: Ireland, Afghanistan 4 points, United Arab Emirates, Netherlands 2.
Final:  142/8 (20 overs);  147/2 (17.3 overs) in Dubai. Afghanistan win by 8 wickets.

Football (soccer)
East Asian Women's Football Championship in Tokyo, Japan:
 0–3 
 2–1 
Final standings: Japan 9 points, China 6, Korea 3, Chinese Taipei 0.
Japan win the tournament for the second consecutive time.
OFC Champions League Group stage, Matchday 4:
Group B: PRK Hekari United  4–0  Tafea FC
Standings: PRK Hekari United, Tafea FC 7 points (4 matches), Lautoka F.C. 6 (3), Marist FC 0 (3)

Handball
Asian Men's Championship in Beirut, Lebanon:
Group E:
 19–26 
 29–20 
Standings (after 1 match): Japan, Saudi Arabia 2 points, Iran, Qatar 0.
Group F:
 32–35 
 38–23 
Standings (after 1 match): South Korea, Bahrain 2 points, Syria, Lebanon 0.
African Men's Championship in Egypt: (teams in bold advance to the main round)
Group A:
 18–26  20–33 Final standings: Tunisia 6 points, Congo DR, Nigeria 3, Libya 0.
Group B:
 33–33  28–20 Final standings: Egypt 6 points, Angola 4, Gabon, Cameroon 1.
Group C: 16–35  20–22 
Finals standings: Algeria 6 points, Morocco 4, Congo 2, Côte d'Ivoire 0.
African Women's Championship in Egypt:
Group A:
 23–24 
 27–31 
Final standings: Tunisia 6 points, Côte d'Ivoire 4, Algeria 2, Cameroon 0.
Group B:
 25–25 
 29–29 
Final standings: Angola 5 points, Congo 4, Egypt 2, Congo DR 1.

Olympic Games
Winter Olympics in Vancouver, British Columbia, Canada:
Alpine skiing – Men's downhill: postponed
Biathlon – Women's sprint:  Anastasiya Kuzmina  19:55.6 (1 penalty),  Magdalena Neuner  (1) 19:57.1  Marie Dorin  20:06.5 (0)
Freestyle skiing – Women's moguls:  Hannah Kearney  26.63  Jennifer Heil  25.69  Shannon Bahrke 25.43
Short track speed skating – Men's 1500 metres:  Lee Jung-su  2:17.611  Apolo Anton Ohno  2:17.976  J.R. Celski  2:18.053
Ski jumping – Normal hill individual:  Simon Ammann  276.5 points (105.0m/108.0m)  Adam Małysz  269.5 (103.5/105)  Gregor Schlierenzauer  268.0 (101.5/106.5)
Speed skating – Men's 5000 metres:  Sven Kramer  6:14.60 OR  Lee Seung-hoon  6:16.95  Ivan Skobrev  6:18.05
Ice hockey – Women:
Group A:
 3–0 
 18–0 
Luge – Men's singles:
Standings after 2 runs: (1) Felix Loch  1:36.570 (2) David Möller  +0.282 (3) Armin Zöggeler  +0.432

Rugby union
Six Nations Championship, week 2:
 31–24  in Cardiff
 33–10  in Paris
Standings: France 4 points (2 matches), England 2 (1), Ireland, Wales 2 (2), Scotland 0 (2), Italy 0 (1).
2011 Rugby World Cup qualifying:
European Nations Cup First Division, matchday 7:
 67–5  in Constanţa
 10–16  in Lisbon
 20–38  in Madrid
Standings: Georgia 20 points (7 matches), Russia 19 (7), Portugal 14 (7), Romania 12 (6), Spain 8 (6), Germany 7 (7).

February 12, 2010 (Friday)

Cricket
West Indies in Australia:
3rd ODI in Sydney:
 225 (49.5 overs);  6/0 (1.0 overs). No result. Australia lead 5-match series 2–0.ICC World Twenty20 Qualifier in United Arab Emirates:
Super Four:
 128/9 (20 overs);  132/6 (18.5 overs) in Dubai. Netherlands win by 4 wickets.
 152/7 (20 overs);  130 (19.1 overs) in Dubai. Ireland win by 22 runs.
Standings (after 2 matches): Ireland, Afghanistan, Netherlands, United Arab Emirates 2 points.

Football (soccer)
OFC Champions League Group stage, Matchday 4:
Group A: AS Manu-Ura  0–2  Auckland City FC
Standings: Auckland City FC 10 points (4 matches), Waitakere United 5 (3), AS Magenta 2 (3), AS Manu-Ura 1 (4).

Handball
African Men's Championship in Egypt: (teams in bold advance to the main round)
Group A:
 27–31 
 22–36 Standings: Tunisia 4 points, Nigeria 3, Congo DR 1, Libya 0.
Group B:
 25–27  17–30 Standings: Egypt, Angola 4 points, Gabon, Cameroon 0.
Group C:
 13–31  23–32 Standings: Algeria, Morocco 4 points, Congo, Côte d'Ivoire 0.
African Women's Championship in Egypt:
Group A:
 15–17 
 20–35 
Standings: Tunisia, Côte d'Ivoire 4 points, Cameroon, Algeria 0.
Group B:
 15–24 
 27–27 
Standings: Angola 4 points, Congo 3, Egypt 1, Congo DR 0.

Sailing
33rd America's Cup in Valencia, Spain:
Race 1: BMW Oracle Racing  defeat Alinghi  by 15:28 minutes. BMW Oracle Racing lead best-of-3 series 1–0.

Olympic Games
Winter Olympics in Vancouver, British Columbia, Canada:
News: Georgian luger Nodar Kumaritashvili dies in a crash during a practice run just few hours before the Opening ceremony.

February 11, 2010 (Thursday)

Auto racing
News: NASCAR announces a change to the green-white-checker rule for all of its national series, effective with today's Gatorade Duels. Up to three attempts at a green-flag finish can now be made, up from one last season. (ESPN)

Basketball
Euroleague Top 16, matchday 3:
Group E:
Maroussi Athens  57–49  Partizan Belgrade
Regal FC Barcelona  83–71  Panathinaikos Athens
Standings: Regal FC Barcelona, Maroussi Athens, Partizan Belgrade 2–1, Panathinaikos Athens 0–3.
Group F:
Maccabi Tel Aviv  72–62  Efes Pilsen Istanbul
Montepaschi Siena  83–76  Real Madrid
Standings: Montepaschi Siena, Maccabi Tel Aviv 2–1, Real Madrid, Efes Pilsen Istanbul 1–2.
Group H: Caja Laboral Baskonia  71–82  Khimki Moscow Region
Standings: Olympiacos Piraeus 3–0, Caja Laboral Baskonia 2–1, Khimki Moscow Region 1–2, Cibona Zagreb 0–3.

Cricket
Bangladesh in New Zealand:
3rd ODI in Christchurch:
 241/9 (50 overs);  244/7 (44.5 overs). New Zealand win by 3 wickets, win the 3-match series 3–0.
ICC World Twenty20 Qualifier in United Arab Emirates: (teams in bold advance to the Super Four)
Group A: 135/4 (20 overs);  106/7 (20 overs) in Dubai. Afghanistan win by 29 runs. 136/7 (20 overs) v  99 all out (18.3 overs) in Dubai. Ireland win by 37 runs.
Final standings: Afghanistan 6 points, Ireland 4, United States 2, Scotland 0.
Group B:;  142/7 (20 overs) 100 (15.5 overs) in Abu Dhabi. United Arab Emirates win by 42 runs.
 130 (19.4 overs);  133/3 (19.1 overs) in Abu Dhabi. Netherlands win by 7 wickets .
Final standings: United Arab Emirates 6 points, Netherlands 4, Kenya 2, Canada 0.

Darts
Premier League round 1 in London, England:
Ronnie Baxter  7–7 Terry Jenkins 
Mervyn King  8–5 Adrian Lewis 
Raymond van Barneveld  8–5 James Wade 
Simon Whitlock  3–8 Phil Taylor 
High Checkout: Mervyn King 124
Standings: Taylor, King, van Barneveld 2 points, Jenkins, Baxter 1, Lewis, Wade, Whitlock 0.

Football (soccer)
East Asian Men's Football Championship in Tokyo, Japan:
 3–0 
Standings (after 2 matches): China, Japan 4 points, Korea 3, Hong Kong 0.
East Asian Women's Football Championship in Tokyo, Japan:
 3–0 
Standings (after 2 matches): Japan 6 points, Korea, China 3, Chinese Taipei 0.
Copa Libertadores Second Stage:
Group 1: Cerro Porteño  1–1  Independiente Medellín
Group 3: Estudiantes  5–1  Juan Aurich
Group 4: Blooming  1–2  Universitario
Group 6: Nacional  3–2  Deportivo Cuenca

Handball
Asian Men's Championship in Beirut, Lebanon: (teams in bold advance to the main round)
Group B: 31–27 Final standings: Japan 4 points, Bahrain 2, Iraq 0.
Group C: 29–23 Final standings: South Korea 4 points, Qatar, United Arab Emirates 1.
African Men's Championship in Egypt:
Group A:
 27–27 
 43–24 
Group B:
 25–22 
 27–21 
Group C:
 24–27 
 11–29 
African Women's Championship in Egypt:
Group A:
 22–19 
 25–19 
Group B:
 37–31 
 32–21 

February 10, 2010 (Wednesday)

Basketball
Euroleague Top 16, matchday 3:
Group G:
CSKA Moscow  84–73  Asseco Prokom Gdynia
Unicaja Málaga  86–68  Žalgiris Kaunas
Standings: CSKA Moscow 3–0, Asseco Prokom Gdynia 2–1, Unicaja Málaga 1–2, Žalgiris Kaunas 0–3.
Group H: Olympiacos Piraeus  78–75  Cibona Zagreb
Standings: Olympiacos Piraeus 3–0, Caja Laboral Baskonia, Khimki Moscow Region 1–1, Cibona Zagreb 0–3.

Cricket
ICC World Twenty20 Qualifier in United Arab Emirates: (teams in bold advance to the Super Four)
Group A:
 131/7 (20 overs);  119/7 (20 overs) in Abu Dhabi. Afghanistan win by 14 runs.
 202/4 (20 overs);  124/6 (20 overs) in Abu Dhabi. Ireland win by 78 runs.
Standings: Afghanistan 4 points, Ireland, United States 2, Scotland 0.
Group B:
 138/9 (20 overs);  141/1 (14.5 overs) in Dubai. Kenya win by 9 wickets.
 164/8 (20 overs);  168/4 (18.5 overs) in Dubai. United Arab Emirates win by 6 wickets.
Standings: United Arab Emirates 4 points, Kenya, Netherlands 2, Canada 0.

Football (soccer)
East Asian Men's Football Championship in Tokyo, Japan:
 3–0 
Standings: China 4 points (2 matches), Korea 3 (2), Japan 1 (1), Hong Kong 0 (1).
East Asian Women's Football Championship in Tokyo, Japan:
 2–1 
Standings: Korea 3 points (2 matches), Japan 3 (1), China 3 (2), Chinese Taipei 0 (1).
Copa Libertadores First Stage, second leg: (first leg score in parentheses)Emelec  2–1 (0–0)  Newell's Old Boys. Emelec win 2–1 on aggregate.
Copa Libertadores Second Stage:
Group 2: São Paulo  2–0  Monterrey
Group 3: Bolívar  1–3  Alianza Lima
Group 6: Banfield  2–1  Morelia
Group 7: Vélez Sársfield  2–0  Cruzeiro

Handball
Asian Men's Championship in Beirut, Lebanon: (teams in bold advance to the main round)
Group A: 20–22 
Final standings: Syria 2 points, Saudi Arabia 2, China 2.
Group D: 25–16 Final standings: Iran 4 points, Lebanon 2, Jordan 0.

February 9, 2010 (Tuesday)

Basketball
ULEB Eurocup Last 16, matchday 3:
Group I:
ALBA Berlin  61–65  Aris BSA 2003
Le Mans  62–70   DKV Joventut
Group J:
UNICS Kazan  78–71   Hapoel Jerusalem
Galatasaray Café Crown  78–82  Power Elec Valencia
Group K:
Panellinios BC  88–79   Benetton Basket
Brose Baskets  55–76  Bizkaia Bilbao Basket
Group L:
Türk Telekom  67–89   Crvena zvezda
Gran Canaria 2014  69–54  ČEZ Nymburk

Cricket
South Africa In India:
1st Test in Nagpur:
 558/6d (Hashim Amla 253*, Jacques Kallis 173);  233 (Virender Sehwag 109, Dale Steyn 7–51) and 319 (Sachin Tendulkar 100) (f/o). South Africa win by an innings and 6 runs, lead the 2-match series 1–0.
West Indies in Australia:
2nd ODI in Adelaide:
 170 (39.4 overs);  171/2 (26.3 overs). Australia win by 8 wickets, lead the 5-match series 2–0.ICC World Twenty20 Qualifier in United Arab Emirates:
Group A:
 139/8 (20 overs);  126 all out (19.2 overs) in Dubai. Afghanistan win by 13 runs.
 120/7 (20 overs);  121/4 (20 overs) in Abu Dhabi. USA win by 6 wickets.
Group B:
 142/7 (20 overs);  146/4 (19.1 overs) in Dubai. Netherlands win by 6 wickets.
 165/5 (20 overs);  150/5 (20 overs) in Abu Dhabi. UAE win by 15 runs.

Football (soccer)
Copa Libertadores First Stage, second leg: (first leg score in parentheses)Universidad Católica  3–2 (2–3)  Colón. 5–5 on aggregate, Universidad Católica win 5–3 in penalty shootout.
Copa Libertadores Second Stage:
Group 2: Nacional  0–2  Once Caldas
Group 4: Lanús  0–2  Libertad
Group 5: Cerro  2–0  Deportivo Quito

Handball
Asian Men's Championship in Beirut, Lebanon: (teams in bold advance to the main round)
Group B:
 19–30 Standings:  Japan (Heian period), Bahrain 2 points (1 match), Iraq 0 (2).
Group C:
 25–25 
Standings: South Korea 2 points (1 match), Qatar 1 (1), United Arab Emirates 1 (2).

February 8, 2010 (Monday)

Cricket
Bangladesh in New Zealand:
2nd ODI in Dunedin:
 183/8 (50 overs);  185/5 (27.3 overs). New Zealand win by 5 wickets, lead the 3-match series 2–0.

Handball
Asian Men's Championship in Beirut, Lebanon: (teams in bold advance to the main round)
Group A: 28–21 
Standings: Saudi Arabia 2 points (1 match), Syria 2 (2), China 0 (1).
Group D: 38–23 
Standings: Iran, Lebanon 2 points (1 match), Jordan 0 (2).

February 7, 2010 (Sunday)

American football
NFL:
Super Bowl XLIV in Miami Gardens, Florida:
New Orleans Saints 31, Indianapolis Colts 17
The Saints' first world championship was propelled by Drew Brees' leadership that led him to his Most Valuable Player award.  Tracy Porter's seventy-yard interception of a Peyton Manning pass for a touchdown was the margin of victory.

Baseball
Caribbean Series in Margarita Island, Venezuela:
Indios de Mayagüez  8–2  Naranjeros de Hermosillo
Leones del Escogido  7–4  Leones del Caracas
Final standings: Leones del Escogido 5–1, Indios de Mayagüez 4–2, Naranjeros de Hermosillo 2–4, Leones del Caracas 1–5.
Leones del Escogido win the Caribbean Series for the third time. Fernando Martínez wins the MVP award.

Cricket
West Indies in Australia:
1st ODI in Melbourne:
 256/8 (50 overs);  143 (34.2 overs). Australia win by 113 runs, lead the 5-match series 1–0.

Football (soccer)
UEFA Euro 2012 qualifying draw in Warsaw, Poland:
East Asian Men's Football Championship in Tokyo, Japan:
 5–0 
East Asian Women's Football Championship in Tokyo, Japan:
 4–0 

Golf
PGA Tour:
Northern Trust Open in Pacific Palisades, California:
Winner: Steve Stricker  268 (−16)
Stricker wins his eighth PGA Tour title.
European Tour:
Dubai Desert Classic in United Arab Emirates:
Winner: Miguel Ángel Jiménez  277 (−11)
Jiménez wins his sixteenth European Tour title.

Handball
Asian Men's Championship in Beirut, Lebanon:
Group B:
 35–21 
Group C:
 30–23 

Rugby union
Six Nations Championship, week 1:
 9–18  in Edinburgh

Ski jumping
World Cup in Willingen, Germany:
HS 145 Team:  Germany (Michael Neumayer, Pascal Bodmer, Martin Schmitt, Michael Uhrmann) 965.5 points  Norway (Johan Remen Evensen, Tom Hilde, Anders Jacobsen, Bjørn Einar Romøren) 959.6  Austria (Florian Schabereiter, Michael Hayböck, Stefan Thurnbichler, David Zauner) 937.1

Tennis
ATP World Tour:
Movistar Open in Santiago, Chile:
Final: Thomaz Bellucci  def. Juan Mónaco  6–2, 0–6, 6–4
It was Bellucci's first title of the year and second of his career.
PBZ Zagreb Indoors in Zagreb, Croatia:
Final: Marin Čilić  def. Michael Berrer  6–4, 6–7(5), 6–3
Čilić wins the tournament for the second straight year, for his second title of the year and 5th of his career.
SA Tennis Open in Johannesburg, South Africa:
Final: Feliciano López  def. Stéphane Robert  7–5, 6–1
López wins his second career title.
Fed Cup:
World Group First Round, day 2:
 1–4  3–2 
 2–3  1–4 World Group II First Round, day 2: 3–2 
 2–3  4–1  3–2 

February 6, 2010 (Saturday)

American football
College bowl games:
Texas vs. The Nation Game in El Paso, Texas
Texas 36, The Nation 17
LSU's Trindon Holliday and the all-star Texas squad helped bring down the final curtain on the college football postseason with a 36–17 victory over The Nation squad.  Holliday was named Offensive Player of the Game.
NFL news:
 The Pro Football Hall of Fame announces its induction class of 2010. Russ Grimm, Rickey Jackson, Dick LeBeau, Floyd Little, John Randle, Jerry Rice, and Emmitt Smith will enter the Hall on August 7.

Auto racing
NASCAR Sprint Cup Series:
Budweiser Shootout in Daytona Beach, Florida:
(1)  Kevin Harvick (2)  Kasey Kahne (3)  Jamie McMurray
Daytona 500 pole qualifying:
  Mark Martin claims pole position, with  Dale Earnhardt Jr. on his outside. The remainder of the field will be set in twin 150-mile qualifiers on February 11.

Baseball
Caribbean Series in Margarita Island, Venezuela:
Naranjeros de Hermosillo  2–7  Leones del Escogido
Indios de Mayagüez  7–1  Leones del Caracas
Standings: Leones del Escogido 4–1, Indios de Mayagüez 3–2, Naranjeros de Hermosillo 2–3, Leones del Caracas 1–4.

Basketball
FIBA Americas League Final Four in Mar del Plata, Argentina:
Quimsa  62–71  Espartanos de Margarita
Peñarol  93–91 (OT)  Halcones Xalapa
Final standings: Peñarol 3–0, Espartanos de Margarita, Halcones Xalapa, Quimsa 1–2.
Peñarol win the title for the second time in three years.

Cross-country skiing
World Cup in Canmore, Canada:
Women's Sprint Classic:  Justyna Kowalczyk   Ida Ingemarsdotter   Sara Renner 
Overall standings: (1) Kowalczyk 1595 points (2) Petra Majdič  1191 (3) Aino-Kaisa Saarinen  909
Sprint standings: (1) Majdič 446 points (2) Kowalczyk 439 (3) Saarinen 295
Men's Sprint Classic:  Emil Jönsson   John Kristian Dahl   Dario Cologna 
Overall standings: (1) Petter Northug  1060 points (2) Lukáš Bauer  763 (3) Cologna 735
Sprint standings: (1) Jönsson 327 points (2) Dahl 280 (3) Ola Vigen Hattestad  250

Football (soccer)
AFC Champions League qualifying play-off, Final Round:Singapore Armed Forces  0–0 (4–3 pen.)  Muangthong UnitedAl-Wahda  5–2  Churchill Brothers
East Asian Men's Football Championship in Tokyo, Japan:
 0–0 
East Asian Women's Football Championship in Tokyo, Japan:
 2–0 

Handball
Asian Men's Championship in Beirut, Lebanon:
Group A:
 23–22 
Group D:
 21–34 

Rugby union
Six Nations Championship, week 1:
Ireland 29–11  in Dublin
 30–17  in London
2011 Rugby World Cup qualifying:
European Nations Cup First Division, matchday 6:
 14–10  in Sochi
 –  in Bucharest — postponed (snow)
 77–3  in Tbilisi
Standings: Georgia 17 points (6 matches), Russia 16 (6), Portugal 13 (6), Romania 9 (5), Spain 7 (5), Germany 6 (6).
IRB Sevens World Series
New Zealand Sevens in Wellington:
Cup Final:  14–19 
Standings after 3 of 8 rounds: (1)  64 points (2) Fiji 60 (3) Samoa 46

Ski jumping
World Cup in Willingen, Germany:
HS 145:  Gregor Schlierenzauer  273.3 points (142.5m/137.5m)  Anders Jacobsen  269.0 (139.0m/138.5m)  Michael Neumayer  264.5 (140.5m/141.0m)
Individual standings (after 19 of 23 events): (1) Simon Ammann  1249 (2) Schlierenzauer 1192 (3) Thomas Morgenstern  749

Snowboarding
World Cup in Sudelfeld, Germany:
Men's parallel giant slalom:  Andreas Prommegger   Benjamin Karl   Roland Haldi 
Standings (after 7 of 10 events): (1) Karl 4800 points (2) Prommegger 4190 (3) Jasey-Jay Anderson  3800
Women's parallel giant slalom:  Amelie Kober   Nicolien Sauerbreij   Marion Kreiner 
Standings (after 7 of 10 events): (1) Sauerbreij 3690 (2) Kober 3470 (3) Fraenzi Maegert-Kohli  3420

Tennis
Fed Cup:
World Group First Round, day 1:
 1–1 
 1–1 
 1–1 
 0–2 
World Group II First Round, day 1:
 1–1 
 1–1 
 2–0 
 2–0 

February 5, 2010 (Friday)

Baseball
Caribbean Series in Margarita Island, Venezuela:
 Indios de Mayagüez 7,  Leones del Escogido 3
  Naranjeros de Hermosillo 3,  Leones del Caracas 2
Standings: Leones del Escogido 3–1, Indios de Mayagüez, Naranjeros de Hermosillo 2–2, Leones del Caracas 1–3.

Basketball
FIBA Americas League Final Four in Mar del Plata, Argentina:
Halcones Xalapa  82–78  Espartanos de Margarita
Peñarol  87–58  Quimsa
Standings: Peñarol 2–0, Quimsa, Halcones Xalapa 1–1, Espartanos de Margarita 0–2.

Cricket
Pakistan in Australia:
Only T20I in Melbourne:
 127 (18.4/20 ov);  125/9 (20/20 ov). Australia win by 2 runs.
Bangladesh in New Zealand:
1st ODI in Napier:
 336/9 (50 ov);  190 (43.5 ov). New Zealand win by 146 runs, lead the 3-match series 1–0.

Cross-country skiing
World Cup in Canmore, Canada:
Women's 10 km Freestyle:  Charlotte Kalla   Justyna Kowalczyk   Irina Khazova 
Overall standings: (1) Kowalczyk 1495 points (2) Petra Majdič  1167 (3) Aino-Kaisa Saarinen  909
Distance standings: (1) Kowalczyk 756 points (2) Majdič 425 (3) Saarinen 414
Men's 15 km Freestyle:  Giorgio Di Centa   Pietro Piller Cottrer   Dario Cologna 
Overall standings: (1) Petter Northug  1060 points (2) Lukáš Bauer  763 (3) Cologna 675
Distance standings: (1) Northug 514 points (2) Marcus Hellner  379 (3) Bauer 363

February 4, 2010 (Thursday)

Baseball
Caribbean Series in Margarita Island, Venezuela:
 Indios de Mayagüez 5,  Naranjeros de Hermosillo 3
 Leones del Escogido 3,  Leones del Caracas 2
Standings: Leones del Escogido 3–0, Leones del Caracas, Naranjeros de Hermosillo, Indios de Mayagüez 1–2.

Basketball
Euroleague Top 16, matchday 2:
Group E: Maroussi Athens  80–78  Panathinaikos Athens
Standings: Partizan Belgrade 2–0, Regal FC Barcelona, Maroussi Athens 1–1, Panathinaikos Athens 0–2.
Group F: Maccabi Tel Aviv  81–76  Real Madrid
Standings: Efes Pilsen Istanbul, Real Madrid, Maccabi Tel Aviv, Montepaschi Siena 1–1.
Group H: Cibona Zagreb  75–78  Caja Laboral Baskonia
Standings: Olympiacos Piraeus 2–0, Caja Laboral Baskonia, Khimki Moscow Region 1–1, Cibona Zagreb 0–2.
FIBA Americas League Final Four in Mar del Plata, Argentina:
Halcones Xalapa  99–101  Quimsa
Peñarol  92–73  Espartanos de Margarita

Cricket
Associates Twenty20 Series in Kenya:
 123 (19.2/20 ov);  126/0 (14.3/20 ov) in Nairobi. Kenya win by 10 wickets.
Final standings: Kenya 8 points, Scotland 4,  0.
Quadrangular Twenty20 Series in Sri Lanka:
 140/6 (20/20 ov);  143/5 (19.5/20 ov) in Colombo. Afghanistan win by 5 wickets.
 174/6 (20/20 ov);  A 178/5 (18.2/20 ov) in Colombo. Sri Lanka A win by 5 wickets.
Final standings: Sri Lanka A 6 points, Afghanistan, Canada, Ireland 2.

Football (soccer)
Copa Libertadores First Stage, second leg: (first leg score in parentheses)Racing  2–0 (2–2)  Junior. Racing win 4–2 on aggregate.

February 3, 2010 (Wednesday)

Baseball
Caribbean Series in Margarita Island, Venezuela:
 Leones del Escogido 7,   Naranjeros de Hermosillo 1
 Leones del Caracas 5,  Indios de Mayagüez 2
Standings: Leones del Escogido 2–0, Leones del Caracas, Naranjeros de Hermosillo 1–1, Indios de Mayagüez 0–2.

Basketball
Euroleague Top 16, matchday 2:
Group E: Partizan Belgrade  67–66 (OT)  Regal FC Barcelona
Barça lose for the first time in this season's Euroleague.
Group F: Efes Pilsen Istanbul  88–78  Montepaschi Siena
Group G:
Žalgiris Kaunas  68–83  CSKA Moscow
Unicaja Málaga  50–70  Asseco Prokom Gdynia
Standings: Asseco Prokom Gdynia, CSKA Moscow 2–0, Unicaja Málaga, Žalgiris Kaunas 0–2.
Group H: Olympiacos Piraeus  87–69  Khimki Moscow Region

Cricket
Bangladesh in New Zealand:
Only T20I in Hamilton:
 78 (17.3 overs);  79/0 (8.2 overs). New Zealand win by 10 wickets.
Associates Twenty20 Series in Kenya:
 163/4 (20/20 ov);  107/9 (20/20 ov) in Nairobi. Scotland win by 56 runs.
Standings:  6 points (3 matches), Scotland 4 (3), Uganda 0 (4).
Quadrangular Twenty20 Series in Sri Lanka:
 176/3 (20/20 ov);  172/8 (20/20 ov) in Colombo. Canada win by 4 runs.
 A 175/5 (20/20 ov);  106/8 (20/20 ov) in Colombo. Sri Lanka A win by 69 runs.
Standings (after 2 matches): Sri Lanka A 4 points, Canada, Ireland 2, Afghanistan 0.

Football (soccer)
Copa Libertadores First Stage, second leg: (first leg score in parentheses)
Estudiantes Tecos  1–2 (0–2)  Juan Aurich. Juan Aurich win 4–1 on aggregate.Cruzeiro  7–0 (1–1)  Real Potosí. Cruzeiro win 8–1 on aggregate.

Ski jumping
World Cup in Klingenthal, Germany:
HS 140:  Simon Ammann  263.9 points (133.0m/134.0m)  Adam Malysz  257.2 (130.5m/134.0m)  Gregor Schlierenzauer  245.4 (129.0m/129.5m)
Individual standings (after 18 of 23 events): (1) Ammann 1249 (2) Schlierenzauer 1092 (3) Thomas Morgenstern  699

February 2, 2010 (Tuesday)

Baseball
Caribbean Series in Margarita Island, Venezuela:
 Leones del Escogido 2,  Indios de Mayagüez 1
 Naranjeros de Hermosillo 7,  Leones del Caracas 1

Basketball
ULEB Eurocup Last 16, matchday 2:
Group I:
ALBA Berlin  72–68   DKV Joventut
Aris BSA 2003  71–72  Le Mans
Group J:
UNICS Kazan  68–72   Power Elec Valencia
Hapoel Jerusalem  100–87  Galatasaray Café Crown
Group K:
Brose Baskets  73–63   Benetton Basket
Bizkaia Bilbao Basket  81–61  Panellinios BC
Group L:
Crvena zvezda  97–67  Gran Canaria 2014
Türk Telekom  92–97  ČEZ Nymburk

Cricket
Associates Twenty20 Series in Kenya:
 186/3 (20 overs);  172/9 (20 overs) in Nairobi. Kenya win by 14 runs.
Standings: Kenya 6 points (3 matches),  2 (2), Uganda 0 (3).

Football (soccer)
Copa Libertadores First Stage, second leg: (first leg score in parentheses)Libertad  3–1 (0–1)  Deportivo Táchira. Libertad win 3–2 on aggregate.

February 1, 2010 (Monday)

Cricket
Associates Twenty20 Series in Kenya:
 109/9 (20/20 ov);  110/0 (12.3/20 ov) in Nairobi. Kenya win by 10 wickets.
Standings (after 2 matches): Kenya 4 points, Scotland 2,  0.
Quadrangular Twenty20 Series in Sri Lanka:
 93/6 (20/20 ov);  A 94/1 (13/20 ov) in Colombo. Sri Lanka A win by 9 wickets.
 121/9 (20/20 ov);  124/5 (18.1/20 ov) in Colombo. Ireland win by 5 wickets'''.

References

II